= Puerto Rico Soccer League Regular Season Cup =

- Founded: 2008
- Region: Puerto Rico (CONCACAF)
- Number of teams: 6
- Current champions: Sevilla FC Puerto Rico (2)
- Most successful club(s): Sevilla FC Puerto Rico (2008, 2011)
- Television broadcasters: WAPA TV, OneLink
- Website: http://www.prsoccer.org
- 2011 Puerto Rico Soccer League season

The Puerto Rico Soccer League Regular Season Cup, first played in 2008, is an annual league competition for Puerto Rico Soccer League. The top four teams advance to the PlayOff cup.

== History ==
=== Puerto Rico Soccer League Regular Season Champions by Season ===
Season	Champion	Points
2008	Sevilla FC Bayamón (1)	32
2009	CA River Plate Ponce (1)	44
2010	Did not take place	
2011	Sevilla FC Juncos (2)	31

=== 2008 Puerto Rico Soccer League regular season ===
The 2008 Puerto Rico Soccer League season is the first season that the league has been held. It had eight teams playing and the top four teams advanced to the PlayOffs cup, where semi-final matches were played to determine the teams moving to the championship game. This year, the Sevilla FC Bayamón won both the Regular Season and the PlayOffs cup. The team them took both cups to Spain and gave them to the main club Sevilla FC in a ceremony at the star of La Liga.

Pos.	Team	GP	W	L	D	Diff.	Pts.
1	Sevilla FC Bayamón	14	10	2	2	45-14	32
2	CA River Plate Ponce	14	8	4	2	42-12	28
3	Atlético de San Juan FC	14	8	3	3	42-21	27
4	Guaynabo Fluminense FC	14	6	7	1	40-13	25
5	Academia Quintana FC	14	6	1	7	28-27	19
6	Gigantes de Carolina FC	14	4	3	7	26-29	15
7	Huracán FC Caguas	14	2	2	10	11-38	8
8	CF Tornados de Humacao	14	1	0	13	9-89	3

=== 2009 Puerto Rico Soccer League regular season ===
The 2009 Puerto Rico Soccer League season saw the addition of a ninth team, the Bayamón FC, which ended up winning the PlayOffs cup. Nevertheless, the CA River Plate Ponce had an undefeated season, winning the Regular Season cup.

Pos.	Team	GP	W	L	D	Diff.	Pts.
1	CA River Plate Ponce	16	14	2	0	56-14	44
2	Bayamón FC	16	11	3	2	44-10	36
3	Sevilla FC Juncos	16	10	2	4	43-18	32
4	Atlético de San Juan FC	16	10	1	5	27-20	31
5	Gigantes de Carolina FC	16	5	3	8	18-19	18
6	Academia Quintana FC	16	4	5	7	19-26	17
7	Guaynabo Fluminense FC	16	5	2	9	24-35	17
5	Huracán FC Caguas	16	2	1	13	20-58	7
5	CF Tornados de Humacao	16	0	3	13	16-57	3

=== 2010 Puerto Rico Soccer League regular season ===
The 2010 season was suspended. In its place, the Súper Copa DirectTV was held to determine Puerto Rico's representatives at the 2011 CFU Club Championship.

=== 2011 Puerto Rico Soccer League regular season ===
During the 2011 Puerto Rico Soccer League season, several teams decided not to compete. The total number of team playing was reduced to six. Out of the nine teams that played the 2009 season, only three remained. The 2011 expansion team was FC Leones de Ponce, which ended up winning the PlayOffs cup. The other two teams (Mayagüez FC & Puerto Rico United SC) had already played the 2010 cup. The Sevilla FC Juncos won its second Regular Season cup.

Pos.	Team	GP	W	L	D	Diff.	Pts.
1	Sevilla FC Juncos	15	9	4	2	48-17	31
2	FC Leones de Ponce	15	7	5	3	49-22	26
3	CA River Plate Fajardo	15	7	4	4	62-17	25
4	Puerto Rico United SC *	15	7	2	6	29-33	23
5	Mayagüez FC	15	6	3	6	31-27	21
6	Huracán FC Caguas	15	0	0	15	10-113	0

* Mayagüez FC (fifth placed) replaced the fourth placed Puerto Rico United SC in the PlayOffs cup as PR United SC had been suspended by PRSL.

== See also ==
- Puerto Rican Football Federation
- Puerto Rico national football team
- Puerto Rico U-20 national football team
- Liga Nacional de Futbol de Puerto Rico
- Association Football in Puerto Rico
- Puerto Rico Islanders
