= Puerto Rico Soccer League PlayOff Cup =

- Founded: 2008
- Region: Puerto Rico (CONCACAF)
- Number of teams: 2 (final stage); 4 (total)
- Current champions: FC Leones de Ponce (1st time)
- Most successful club(s): Sevilla FC Puerto Rico (1); Bayamón FC (1); FC Leones de Ponce (1)
- Television broadcasters: WAPA TV, OneLink
- Website: PRSoccer.org
- 2011 Puerto Rico Soccer League season

The PRSL PlayOffs Cup is the annual championship tournament of the Puerto Rico Soccer League. The winner gets an automatic bid to CFU Club Championship.

== History ==
=== Puerto Rico Soccer League Playoff Champions by Season ===
Year	Final			Semifinalists
Year	Champion	Score	Runner-up	Semifinalists
2008	Sevilla FC Bayamón	2 - 1	CA River Plate Ponce	Atlético de San Juan FC; Guaynabo Fluminense FC
2009	Bayamón FC	3 - 2	Atlético de San Juan FC	Sevilla FC Juncos; CA River Plate Ponce
2010	Did not take place			
2011	FC Leones de Ponce	1(3) - 1(0)	Sevilla FC Juncos	CA River Plate Fajardo; Mayagüez FC

=== 2008 Puerto Rico Soccer League Playoffs ===
The 2008 Puerto Rico Soccer League PlayOffs is the first year that the tournament has been held. It is the championship cup for the Puerto Rico Soccer League. The format is set up for the top 4 teams from the Regular Season cup playing in the Tournament. These teams play a semi-final match, with the winner of each advancing on to the championship game.

Semi-finals
Sevilla FC Bayamón	2
Atlético de San Juan FC	0
CA River Plate Ponce	2
Guaynabo Fluminense FC	1

Final
Sevilla FC Bayamón	2
CA River Plate Ponce	1

==== Champions ====
Sevilla FC Bayamón won the Championship as they defeated CA River Plate Ponce 2-1 in the Final.

=== 2009 Puerto Rico Soccer League Playoffs ===
The 2009 Puerto Rico Soccer League PlayOffs is the second year that this format has been used. The format follows the same as the 2008 edition, with the top 4 teams from the Regular Season cup playing in the Tournament, but with the addition of a Home Leg and an Away Leg for the semifinal and final matches.

Semi-finals
CA River Plate Ponce	1
Atlético de San Juan FC	2 AGG
Bayamón FC	3 AGG
Sevilla FC Juncos	2

Final
Atlético de San Juan FC	2
Bayamón FC	3 AGG

==== Champions ====
Bayamón FC won the championship as they defeated Atlético de San Juan FC 3-2 in aggregate.

=== 2010 Puerto Rico Soccer League Playoffs ===
There was no PlayOffs cup this year, since the regular season was suspended. In its place, the Súper Copa DirectTV was held to determine Puerto Rico's representatives at the 2011 CFU Club Championship.

=== 2011 Puerto Rico Soccer League Playoffs ===
The 2009 Puerto Rico Soccer League PlayOffs presented two changes from previous seasons. First, it went back to a single leg format. Second, it did not have all four semifinalist play each other. In its place, the quarterfinal saw the third and fourth placed teams in the Regular Season cup facing each other. The winner went off to face the second placed team in the semifinals. Finally, the winner of the semifinal went off to face the champion of the Regular Season cup for the PlayOff Championship.

First round
CA River Plate Fajardo	4
Mayagüez FC	1

Second round
FC Leones de Ponce	2
CA River Plate Fajardo	1

Final
Sevilla FC Juncos	1 (0)
FC Leones de Ponce	1 (3)

^{+} Mayagüez FC (fifth placed) replaced the fourth placed Puerto Rico United SC as it had been suspended by PRSL.

==== Champions ====
FC Leones de Ponce won the championship as they defeated Sevilla FC Juncos in penalties. After 120 minutes, the match ended up with a 1-goal each tie. In the penalty round, the first three attempts for FC Leones de Ponce were successful, and the team managed to stop all three first attempts for Sevilla FC PR, earning its first championship title.

== See also ==
- Puerto Rican Football Federation
- Puerto Rico national football team
- Puerto Rico U-20 national football team
- Liga Nacional de Futbol de Puerto Rico
- Association Football in Puerto Rico
- Puerto Rico Islanders
