= 2011 Puerto Rico Soccer League season =

Puerto Rico Soccer League
- Season: 2011
- Champions: FC Leones de Ponce
- Matches played: 48
- Goals scored: 242 (5.04 per match)
- Biggest home win: FC Leones de Ponce; 17–0; Huracán FC Caguas; CA River Plate Puerto Rico; 17-0; Huracán FC Caguas
- Biggest away win: Huracán FC Caguas; 2–10; CA River Plate Puerto Rico
- Highest scoring: FC Leones de Ponce; 17–0; Huracán FC Caguas; CA River Plate Puerto Rico; 17-0; Huracán FC Caguas

The 2011 Puerto Rico Soccer League season was the 3rd season of Puerto Rico's top-division professional football league. The regular season ran from April to July 2011. The league had planned in 2010 to make use of an Apertura and Clausura format, but this format was not utilized. The Sevilla FC Puerto Rico won the regular season, but was defeated at the Playoff final by debuting FC Leones de Ponce.

== Teams ==
Fajardo FC, Guaynabo Fluminense FC and Puerto Rico Islanders FC did not compete in the competition, with the Islanders taking part in the inaugural season of the NASL. Nevertheless, FC Leones de Ponce entered the competition, adding up to six clubs the number of teams participating in the season. Three of the clubs —Puerto Rico United SC, CA River Plate Puerto Rico and Sevilla FC Puerto Rico— took part in the inaugural season of the USL Pro. However, due to financial difficulties, the clubs were removed from USL Pro competition after only five games. Completed matches still counted towards the standings and were double both PRSL and USL Pro league matches.

Locations of the 2011 Puerto Rico Soccer League teams

Club	Home city	Stadium
FC Leones de Ponce	Ponce	Francisco Montaner Stadium
Huracán FC Caguas	Caguas	Yldefonso Solá Morales Stadium
Mayagüez FC	Mayagüez	Mayagüez Athletics Stadium
Puerto Rico United SC	Aguada	Aguada Stadium
CA River Plate Fajardo	Fajardo	Roberto Clemente Stadium (Note: River Plate PR are playing in Roberto Clemente Stadium in Carolina while their home stadium in Fajardo is being built.)
Sevilla FC Juncos	Juncos	Sevilla FC Stadium

== Standings ==
Pos	Team	Pld	W	D	L	GF	GA	GD	Pts	Qualification
1	Sevilla FC Puerto Rico (C)	15	9	4	2	48	17	+31	31	Advances directly to the PlayOffs final.
2	FC Leones	15	7	5	3	49	22	+27	26	Advances directly to the PlayOffs semifinal.
3	River Plate Puerto Rico	15	7	4	4	62	17	+45	25	Advances to the PlayOffs quarterfinal.
4	Puerto Rico United (D)	15	7	2	6	29	33	−4	23	Sanctioned with suspension by PRSL due to failure to meet PRSL regulations.
5	Mayagüez FC	15	6	3	6	31	27	+4	21	Advances to the PlayOffs quarterfinal.
6	Huracán de Caguas	15	0	0	15	10	113	−103	0	

Updated to match(es) played on 24 July 2011. Source: PRSoccer.org
Rules for classification: 1) points; 2) goal difference; 3) number of goals scored.
(C) Regular season champion; (D) Disqualified

== Results ==
=== Matches 1–10 ===
Home \ Away	HUR	LEO	MAY	PRU	RIV	SEV
Huracán de Caguas		0–4	0–7	1–5	2–10	0–3
FC Leones	5–1		3–1	3–1	1–4	4–4
Mayagüez FC	5–0	2–1		0–1	1–3	0–2
Puerto Rico United	5–0	0–0	6–0		2–1	1–1
River Plate Puerto Rico	7–0	0–1	2–2	10–0		2–2
Sevilla FC Puerto Rico	10–0	2–0	1–3	2–3	1–0	

Updated to match(es) played on 29 July 2011. Source: PRSoccer.org
Legend: Blue = home team win; Yellow = draw; Red = away team win.

=== Matches 11–15 ===
Home \ Away	HUR	LEO	MAY	PRU	RIV	SEV
Huracán de Caguas			3–5	3–4		
FC Leones	17–0				2–2	3–3
Mayagüez FC		2–2			0–0	
Puerto Rico United		0–3	1–3		0–3	
River Plate Puerto Rico	17–0					1–3
Sevilla FC Puerto Rico	9–0		2–0	3–0		

Updated to match(es) played on 19 July 2011. Source: FIFA.org
Legend: Blue = home team win; Yellow = draw; Red = away team win.

During the second half of the seasons, teams will only face each other one time, resulting in an unequal count of Home/Away games.

== PlayOffs ==
First round
July 27*
CA River Plate Fajardo	4
Mayagüez FC	1

Second round
July 29*
FC Leones de Ponce	2
CA River Plate Fajardo	1

Final
July 31
Sevilla FC Juncos	1 (0)
FC Leones de Ponce	1 (3)

^{*} Both quarterfinal and semifinal games have been rescheduled. The original dates were July 26 and 28 respectively.
^{+} Mayagüez FC (fifth placed) replaced the fourth placed Puerto Rico United SC as it had been suspended by PRSL.

Puerto Rico Soccer League
Preceded by CA River Plate Puerto Rico	2011; Champion; FC Leones de Ponce; 1st title	Current holder
