= 2010 Puerto Rico Soccer League season =

One-off competition / qualifying tournament

SúperCopa DirecTV
- Season: 2010
- Champions: CA River Plate Puerto Rico
- CFU Club Championship: CA River Plate Puerto Rico; Puerto Rico Islanders FC
- CONCACAF Champions League: Puerto Rico Islanders FC (2011 CFU Club Championship champion)
- Matches played: 30
- Goals scored: 112 (3.73 per match)
- Biggest home win: CA River Plate Puerto Rico; 7–0; Fajardo FC
- Biggest away win: Huracán FC; 0–11; Puerto Rico Islanders FC
- Highest scoring: Huracán FC; 0–11; Puerto Rico Islanders FC

The 2010 Puerto Rico Soccer League season (officially known as the SúperCopa DirecTV 2010 for sponsorship reasons) was a one-off competition that served as a qualifying tournament for Puerto Rican teams to the 2011 CFU Club Championship. It was won by CA River Plate Ponce, who qualified to the Caribbean tournament alongside the Puerto Rico Islanders FC.

== Competition format ==
For the competition, the eight teams were divided into two groups of four. The teams will play within their group in a double round-robin format. The top two teams from each group advanced to the playoffs, where the winner of each group will play the runner-up of the other group. The playoffs consisted of a semifinal and final stage, each contested over a two legs. The two teams that advance to the final will qualify to the 2011 CFU Club Championship.

== Teams ==
Locations of the 2010 Puerto Rico Soccer League teams

Club	Home City	Stadium
Fajardo FC	Fajardo	Fajardo Stadium
Guaynabo Fluminense FC	Guaynabo	Sixto Escobar Stadium
Huracán FC Caguas	Caguas	Yldefonso Solá Morales Stadium
Mayagüez FC	Mayagüez	Mayagüez Athletics Stadium
Puerto Rico Islanders FC	Bayamón	Juan Ramón Loubriel Stadium
Puerto Rico United SC	Aguada	Aguada Stadium
CA River Plate Ponce	Ponce	Francisco Montaner Stadium
Sevilla FC Juncos	Juncos	Sevilla FC Stadium

== First stage ==
=== Group A ===
Pos	Team	Pld	W	D	L	GF	GA	GD	Pts	Qualification	RIV	MAY	FLU	FAJ
1	River Plate Puerto Rico	6	6	0	0	29	2	+27	18	Advanced to the Playoffs		1–0	4–1	7–0
2	Mayagüez FC	6	2	1	3	5	10	−5	7	Advanced to the Playoffs	0–1		4–0	0–5
3	Guaynabo Fluminense	6	2	1	3	12	19	−7	7		1–9	3–1		6–0
4	Fajardo FC	6	0	2	4	6	21	−15	2		0–7	0–0	1–1	

=== Group B ===
Pos	Team	Pld	W	D	L	GF	GA	GD	Pts	Qualification	PRI	SEV	PRU	HUR
1	Puerto Rico Islanders	6	5	1	0	27	2	+25	16	Advanced to the Playoffs		1–1	4–0	6–0
2	Sevilla FC Puerto Rico	6	4	1	1	10	5	+5	13	Advanced to the Playoffs	1–2		3–0	1–0
3	Puerto Rico United SC	6	1	0	5	6	15	−9	3		0–3	0–1		6–0
4	Huracán FC Caguas	6	1	0	5	6	27	−21	3		0–11	2–3	4–0	

== Playoffs ==
Semifinals
1	CA River Plate Ponce	1	1	2
2	Sevilla FC Juncos	0	1	1
2	Mayagüez FC	1	0	1
1	Puerto Rico Islanders FC	2	2	4

Finals
1	CA River Plate Ponce	1	2	3
1	Puerto Rico Islanders FC	0	0	0

Puerto Rico Soccer League
Preceded by Bayamón FC	2010; Champion; CA River Plate Puerto Rico; First title	Succeeded by FC Leones de Ponce
