= Football in Puerto Rico =

Football is one of the leading sports of Puerto Rico, ranking only behind baseball, basketball and boxing in national popularity and is the number one participation sport on the island. There has been a significant growth in the sport in recent years, as traditionally football has played a very small role in Puerto Rico. The sport on the island is governed by the Puerto Rican Football Federation, an affiliate of FIFA.

== History ==
=== Early years (1900-1919) ===
It is said that the sport was played during Spanish colonial times, mostly by soldiers in the field in front of El Morro. By 1904, games were being played there between sailors of foreign ships which docked in San Juan Harbor, but it was not until 1911 that the first organized club was formed, Comercio Sporting Club, which organized games between members of the club. The club then formed two teams, Minerva and Mercurio. These teams took part in the first organized tournament in Puerto Rico, Copa Porananmiz. In 1913, two more clubs where formed, San Juan FC and Ponce Sporting Club. Until then, football was mostly played by the Hispanic population of the island while the Americans would play sports like baseball and basketball, but in 1914 a group of Americans formed Celtics FC and the first rivalry of Puerto Rican football was born. Celtics were Americans and San Juan FC were Puerto Ricans and Spaniards, which brought up the tensions between the Hispanics and Americans in the island during this period. In 1914, Celtics traveled to Ponce to face Ponce Sporting Club, in the first ever reported game between teams from different towns in Puerto Rico.

=== 1950s-1960s ===
The Jumacao F.C., Caribes, Arqueros Verdes, Puerta de Tierra, CAAM, UPR, Yauco, Audax, Millonarios, Suizos, Juventud, Hato Rey, San Juan and Santurce teams formed the football scene of the 1950s. In 1945, Paquito Cordero, Terry García and Baby Figueroa organized the Arqueros Verdes, winning the Torneo Infantil its first season. The 1946 season included the Cangrejeros, Bayamón, Santa Rita, Camisas Negras, Eleven Stars and Dragones as well, but they won their second title. In 1947, Hato Rey won the Torneo Juvenil over the Arqueros. In 1947, the frigate La Argentina visited San Juan and its crew played against the national team, with Puerto Rico winning 2–1. The Caribes and Arqueros fused into the Caribes-Arqueros and win the Superior Class title in 1949, with José Laureano Cantero as coach. The team participated in two exhibition games against Guadeloupe, but lost the series. In 1949, La Argentina returned to San Juan for another scrimmage. In 1948, Puerto Rico played a game a team from the Argentina Air Force. During the winter of 1949, the AFA began trials to organize a national team for the 1950 Central American and Caribbean Games, holding scrimmages with a team from Norway. After the AFA reorganized its administration, the Copa Puerto Rico was announced. The team from Universidad de la Habana was also brought in to help the national team prepare. On April 19, 1950, the UPR-RP debuted a new field at Río Piedras, fielding its Varsity and Industrial Arts team against Arqueros Verdes and Santurce FC, before competing against the CAAM in a tournament.

The YMCA at Hato Rey hosted the Baby-Fútbol (U12) tournament and other categories continued playing in places such as El Escambrón. The program withdrew from the Central American and Caribbean Games (CACG), but the national team continued active against local teams and a series against Guadalupian teams North Champions and Basseterre (losing 0–6 and 0–7) and the crew of the Spanish training ship Juan Sebastián Elcano (winning 4–1 and 2–1. Youth teams La Sultana LAP and Joyería Echevarría competed in the youth categories. The AFA declared the celebration of a "Week of Football" and hosted Universidad de la Habana, but this did not result in a good turnout at Estadio Sixto Escobar and caused economic losses for the federation. Despite this, they hosted the Escuela Naval de Venezuela the following month, which Puerto Rico defeated 5–2. With the support of Julio Enrique Monagas the AFA contracted Juan San Vicente a summer tournament was organized with Arqueros Verdes, San Juan, Hato Rey y Santurce, while other teams were organized in the central and south regions. The AFA also debuted its Campeonato Metropolitano, featuring the 34 teams in three youth divisions. A series against the crew of the HMS Glasgow began on September 29, 1950, with Puerto Rico defeating the British 3–2 and Arqueros Verdes 5–0. The following month the crew of the frigate La Argentina also played against a local youth selection and the Arqueros. The AFA also emphasized the south region, hosting a tournament with the participation of the Ponce Sporting, Yauco Audax and Guánica Athletic Club.

In 1951, Ponce F.C., Audax, University of Puerto Rico at Mayaguez (CAAM) and Arqueros Verdes competed in a tournament In January 1951. The teams from the universities also held a preparatory series between them. In 1951, the Liga Superior featured the Arqueros, Santurce, San Juan, Puerta de Tierra, CAAM, University of Puerto Rico at Rio Piedras (UPR-RP), Audax and Bayamón. The Arqueros Verdes with Paquito Cordero began the tournament on an undefeated streak until they suffered a lone loss to Puerta de Tierra 1–2, winning both rounds and repeating as champions. During this time, local teams held exhibitions both among themselves and against guest teams in a series which featured Bayamón defeating an United States Navy selection 5–1, Arqueros Verdes defeating the crew of the Norwegian ship Benny 4–0 and the Puerto Rico national team defeating the crew of the Canadian cruiser Ontario. In September 1951, Puerto Rico hosted the Amateur Football Congress of the Caribbean, which intended to organize the region into a confederation that mimicked the Caribbean Series format used in baseball, but ultimately failed in this goal. The following year another reunion was held by the CFC at Kingston with Rafita Báez being selected for a regional team. Santurce F.C. defense Félix Seijo took part in the next CFC Caribbean Stars lineup. During the offseason, exhibition matches against the Swedish ship Gotland and the inter-university series were held. Despite facing internal issues that limited its activity, the AFA also organized the youth tournament. After the First Division tournament was cancelled, the Copa El Mundo was held with the team of the Dutch cruiser William van der Zarr as guests. In 1953, the British corvette HMS Austell Bay played at San Juan, with the national team winning a game 3–2. The AFA also participated in the Central American Football Congress. The Arqueros, Santurce, Hato Rey, CAAM and UPR competed in an abridged AMA tournament won by Santurce FC. The inter-university series continued going strong, while the AFA was disorganized. In 1954, the Dutch ship New Amsterdam and the French Jean D'Arc poayed exhibitions at San Juan. While private initiatives kept football active in the south and western coasts, the AFA reorganized after nearly a year of inactivity and resumed operations in 1955 and Frederick Stark was brought in to manage the teams and reawaken the Arqueros, Caribes and Hato Rey FC.

By this time, the sport was mostly unreachable for the general public and had a consistent dependency on foreigners that relocated to Puerto Rico. By 1956, there was an influx of Puerto Rican players. The Caribes held exhibitions against the Brazilian school boat Duque de Caixas, the Spanish steamship Marqués de Comillas (0-0 draw) and the Dutch warship Wilhem Van der Zaar. The team also faced CAAM, which also held the intercollegiate series against UPR, in preparation for the Liga Superior. The Caribes also won the Comercial García Cup defeating Club Iberia, Vocacional Metropolitana and the UPR. Following this, the youth tournaments were held. During the offseason, the Iberia tied 0-0 with the crew of the Spanish frigate La Galeta. The Caribes faced the British warship HMS Morecambe following the strike of hurricane Santa Clara. As the effects on infrastructure were felt, the AFA reorganized its directive and efforts were made to have football implemented in the school curriculums. The universities formed a CAAM-UPR-RP select which travelled to St. Kitts for a series of three exhibitions. These colleges, Caribes and Vocacional Miguel Such were joined by Club Millinarios, which included Cordero and several television figures associated with WKAQ-TV (Telemundo Puerto Rico). The Caribes were active in exhibitions against the local teams and a Durch warship (which they won 6–4) and sponsoring the second division. During this time, Juan Tulier emerged a notable figure as both a player and promoter and was responsible for the airing of a game where his team, the All Boys, defeated Millonarios (5–1) at Humacao. This led to the foundation of the Jumacao Football Club/Humacao Warriors FC in March 1958. In 1957, the AFA once again reorganized itself, with preliminary series and a tournament (won by the Caribes) being held. The federation also sanctioned a game between the national team and cadets from Annapolis, which Puerto Rico won 4–0. The British ship Ulster was brought in for a series which included a 2–2 draw against the Caribes, a 4–3 win for Millonarios and a 2–2 tie with the national team.

In September 1957, Puerto Rico won an exhibition against the crew of the Argentine vessel Bahía Blanca 3–2. The Caribes won the first round of the Torneo Superior undefeated, ultimately winning the second stage by edging the Arqueros Verdes (8 to 7 in standing points). The Diablos Rojos, a team of Swiss nationals, lost exhibitions to the Millonarios (4–1) and Arqueros (4–0). During the spring of 1958, the Campeonato Metropolitano de Fútbol Juvenil and a series between the Caribes and the Dutch ship Van Speijk (4–2 win and 4–4 draw) were held. In the LAI, CAAM won the title. The British submarine HMS Tip Toe and Argentinian warship Bahía Thetis played against Arqueros, Caribes, Diablos Rojos and Millonarios. In May 1958, the AFA was included in the structure of the Puerto Rico Olympic Committee (COPUR). These teams along the Santurce Lions and Juventud participated in the Copa San Juan Bautista, held in June and won by the Arqueros. Prior to the 1959 Central American and Caribbean Games, the national team defeated the British Trowbridge 2–1 and contracted Eduardo Ordoñez as coach. The same clubs competed in the Campeonato de Puerto Rico, with Arqueros Verdes leading all the season and winning the title. Meanwhile, Jumacao F.C. organized its own youth league, while others were held by the federation at San Juan, with the later fielding the Baldritch which won a series fir the national championship. Puerto Rico hosted the 1958 Football Caribbean Series with the participation of Guadalupe, the Martinique Golden Star, Cuba and Mexico. During this time the development of local football became isolated from its Latin American counterparts, but still expanding into new zones due to the work of Saso Tulier and Roberto Monroig, among others. At the 1959 Central American and Caribbean Games Puerto Rico had close games against Mexico (0-2) and Panama (1-2), but ultimately finished with a record of 0-4. The AFA consolidated by requesting mandatory affiliation for the participation in qualifying tournaments, while also training its referees. The superior league expanded with Jumacao FC and organized an invitational tournament with the other teams which was won by Millonarios. Meanwhile, the Caribes began working on building their own venue.

The Caribes won the first round of the Torneo de Clasificación. During the interlude, the federation began the Baby Fútbol tournament and the Caribes defeated the crew of Colombian frigate 20 de Julio. Ultimately, Millonarios won the second round, classifying along Caribes, Jumacao and Diablos Rojos. Despite initially practicing for the 1959 Pan American Games, the federation withdrew Puerto Rico from the event. The municipality of San Juan held the Copa SanJuan Bautista, which was won by Millonarios. After the APA changed leadership again, Ordoñez was contracted to train coaches. The federation also sanctioned a game between the national team and the British warship HMS Ulster, which ended in a 1-1 draw. In another against the frigate Trowbridge was won by Puerto Rico 4-1. In the youth division, Jumacao Junior won the youth championship over Juventud. Millonarios won the 1959 Torneo Amistad. In 1960 the national team defeated the crew of the Norwegian M.S. Bergensfjiord 5-1. Several other games were played by both the national team and clubs, including one where the Caribes defeated Trowbridge (3-0) and Millonarios the HMS Ocean Monarck (6-1). Country Club won the 1960 youth tournament and Guyama the Infantil class. The Copa San Juan Bautista was held mid-season, with Millonarios repeating. Diablos Rojos Suizos won both rounds of the 1960 championship. Afterwards, the national team faced the crew if the HMS Ulster, winning twice 7-0 and 6-1. During the offseason, the team defeated the British ships HMS Rothesay (4-1) and Ocean Monarch (3-0, 5-0) as well as the Dutch ship Maastan (1-0).

In December 1960, Paco Bueso was elected president of the AFA for the following year. In 1961, the AFA reorganized its competition format introducing the Torneo Interescolar, with Central High winning the inaugural season. During the exhibition games, Jumacao-Juventud defeated the Italian ship Victoria (6-5) and British HSM Uster (5-1). The FDE/AFA Torneo de Fútbol Superior was held during the spring, with Jumacao FC emerging champions. Both the Baby-Fútbol (won by Indios de Hato Rey) and Youth tournaments continued being held by the AFA. The 1961 Copa San Juan Bautista was won by Millonarios. The Liga 1961 was the main federative tournament, which debuted its own magazine Marca Deportiva that season, with Atlético de Añasco winning the senior category. The intercollegiate tournament continued being held as it was prior to the reorganization and Interamerican University of Puerto Rico at San Germán winning the title and facing Añasco, with the federative champions winning with a score of 4-0. Francisco González was contracted by the AFA to manage the team at the CACG. In February 1962, Puerto Rico defeated the crew of the Canadian aircraft carrier Bonaventura. That same month, the Colegio de Arbitros de Fútbol de Puerto Rico was founded to organize the referees. The national team was included in the 1962 first division tournament as preparation for the CACG. However, the title was decided between the clubs, with Añasco repeating. Puerto Rico played exhibitions over German sailors (8-0) and a team comprised by foreigners that lived on the island (1-0), among others including Martinique and Guadalupe. At the CACG, the national team played but did not record a win and scored a goal against the host, Jamaica. Locally, the Baby-Fútbol and other youth leagues continued growing with Atletico de Añasco sponsoring teams in each category. During the fall, Puerto Rico defeated the crew of the British HMS Achanti to close a season where Tulier was the sport's main figure.

In the 1963 Torneo Superior concluded with Don Bosco winning the championship and later the Copa Constitución. The Magones del Oratorio San Juan Bosco also won the Fútbol Infantil. Puerto Rico played several exhibitions at Guadalupe, both against the host and Martinique. In August 1963, the FIFA suspended both the AFA and the Dominican Republic for not paying quotas on time. Despite this, these following month Puerto Rico defeated the Aruba national team twice (6-1, 5-1). Presided by José Laureano Cantero, the AFA also sanctioned the Fútbol Juvenil and Fútbol Superior leagues, with Valencia de Guayama and Deportivo Español emerging as champions of their respective classes. In 1964, the federation held the Torneo Preparatorio, which was won by Roosevelt. El Prados won the Campeonato Nacional Juvenil (CNJ) and Roosevelt the Baby Fútbol. In June, the national team won a game against the crew of a Dutch frigate (2-1). In 1964, Puerto Rico participated in its first FIFA Congress. Santurce FC won the 1964 Copa San Juan Bautista. In June, Puerto Rico achieved full CONCACAF membership. With Raúl Marchant González as head coach, the national team defeated the crew of the visiting ships Victoria (3-0), HMS Tartar (3-2), Bergenfiord (3-1) and HMS Alcides (6-0), once again traveling to Martinique for more exhibitions. Don Bosco defeated the Indios in a series for the Metropolitan title and Guayama for the national championship of the Fútbol Infantil. The Internacional Guayamés won the Liga title, with Hato Rey Baroni finishing as runner-up. The team later defeated the Air France team (2-0).

In 1965, the national team exchanged games with Aruba in an exhibition series and defeated the British ship Relentless (2-1), which was followed by a win over a selection of foreign residents for the Copa San Juan Bautista. Atlético de Añasco defeated Centro Europa (5-0) to win the Liga tournament and the Copa Islas Canarias. In August 1965, Hato Rey tied (2-2) with Manta Ecuador, champion of the New York Eastern District League in an exhibition held in that city. Tulier, who was part of the team's roster, was once again selected "Player of the Year". Football continued expanding throughout the island, forcing the federation to shift its emphasis on amateur practice to a participative approach. At the 1966 Central American and Caribbean Games, the national team tied with Cuba (1-1) and El Salvador (2-2), but lost their remaining games. During the summer, the AFA organized the Copa Constitución, which was won by the Yabucoa FC. The team later defeated Deportivo Suramericano in an exhibition (6-0). The Primera División tournament ended with Yabucoa in the first place. In the Baby-Fútbol, Don Bosco continued its successful run, climbing to the top of the standings by going undefeated. The 1966 youth tournaments were won by Hato Rey (Baby Fútbol) and Don Bosco (Liga Infantil). The 1967 Baby Fútbol tournament was won by Yabucoa over Lomas Verdes and Don Bosco repeated as LJ champion over Country Club. In April 1967, the Roosevelt FC travelled to the Dominican Republic, defeating the Refor F.C. (6-2).

Freddie del Valle was the COPUR's Football Player of the Year. Inter de Guayama won the Copa San Juan Bautista over Leones de Ponce. The Festival de Fútbol was held in August 1967, with Roosevelt defeating Refor (1-0) again and the YaJu FC defeating the Peruvian selection (5-2). The national team participated in more exhibitions against Martinique and Guadeloupe. Hato Rey defeated Yabucoa to win the national Juvenile title. Filiberto García was the 1967 Footballer of the Year. Roosevelt won the 1967-68 Liga title. In February 1968, Don Bosco defeated the crew of the German ship Europa (5-1). The UPR-RUM (formerly CAAM) defeated Pontifical Catholic University of Puerto Rico (PUCPR) with scores of 7-4 to win the 1968 LAI title. In 1967, the UPR won the LAI title. The AFA sanctioned new events, including a youth tournament at Guayama and a high school league (won by Einstein High). The superior league debated the Copa Máximo Mercado, which was won by Hato Rey. In April 1968, Don Bosco defeated the Pawtucket High School (5-1) team from Rhode Island. In the youth categories, Hato Rey (Baby Fútbol) and Jumacao Jr. (Juvenil) won the title. Don Bosco won the Copa San Juan Bautista over Roosevelt (4-0). The national team played exhibitions against St. Croix, winning twice (3-1, 3-2) and returned to Guadalupe for its annual series.

In September 1968, the AFA began the process to change its structure into the COPUR federation model, beginning with the drafting on internal regulations. Juan A. Gotay was the 1968 Footballer of the Year. In 1969, Eduardo Ordoñez died, with the news echoing at Spain. The UPR-RUM won the 1969 LAI title. Angel Piñero was elected president of the AFA, being followed by José M. Arsuaga. In the youth divisions, Escuela Superior Albert Einstein (Escolar), Guayama (Escuelas Superioes) and Yabucoa 4-H (Juvenil). Yabucoa 4-H travelled sbroad and won the Olimpiadas Latinoamericanas at New York, winning a game against the local team 4-0 for the CDPH Cup. Academia Quintana debuted as a team that year, as part of the Superior category. The national team held an exhibition against foreign students of the CAAM, winning 3-1. In 1970, Yabuco 4-H (Juvenil) and Caguas (Baby-Fútbol), Escuela Superior de Guayama (Escuelas Superiores) won the youth tournaments. Abroad, Luis Rodríguez played for the Soccer Club Lawton-Fort at Oklahoma. After a team was assembled for the CACG, Puerto Rico played exhibitions against Iberia Madrid (0-0, 2-0), which also sponsored the Copa Iberia. At the tournament, the national team defeated Bahamas 3-1. That season, Don Bosco I won the 1970 Copa San Juan Bautista.

=== 1970-1990 ===
In the final of the 1970-71 Torneo Superior, Don Bosco defeated Guayama (2-1) to claim the title. In 1971, José María Arzuaga took over as president of the AFA, gathering sponsors for the federation. Juan Bosco community continued being an important spot for football, organizing its own cup as well. Don Bosco faced the Tamandare, champion among the Brazilian navy's teams the previous year, winning the game (5-2). The team also defeated the crew of the Peruvian School Boat Independencia (5-1, 2-1). During spring, the Copa Máximo Mercado was organized. The AFA collaborated with the government in organizing the Festival de Fútbol Infantil, while other youth tournaments continued being held. In 1971, Guayama won the Fútbol Superior. That season, Don Bosco defeated Guayama (1-0) to win its own Copa Don Bosco. The national team lost both games against Haiti in the eliminators for the 1972 World Cup and participated in the FPF's Festival de Fútbol. The youth national team traveled to Panama, holding exhibitions against the locals. Roosevelt won the 1972 Fútbol Superior and Internacional won the Segunda, finishing undefeated. In the youth divisions, Añasco won the Baby-Fútbol. A retro series that gathered veterans in the team Arqueros-Caribes and Millonarios-Hato Rey were organized for the Torneo Época de Oro. Juan Sánchez was the FPF's Footballer of the Year.

During this time, other tournaments like the Copa Isla del Encanto (won by Internacional) and the Copa Chile (won by Academia Quintana) were held on various divisions. Añasco defeated Ponce (1-1, 1-0) to become the 1973 Baby-Fútbol champion. The FPF also organized the Copa Luis Villarejo among the best youth teams, including the Internacional. Escuela Superior Juan Ponce de León won its third straight Torneo Escolar national championship. During the summer, Roosevelt F.C. tied (2-2) with Universidad Católica Madre y Maestra (UCMM) and defeated Universidad Católica Santiago de los Caballeros (1-0) to win the Serie Internacional. Afterwards, Roosevelt defeated Yabuco (7-1) to win the Primera División title. Caguas defeated Atlético to win the Segunda División. The FPF also held the Copa América (won by Yabuco 4-H), Copa Máximo Mercado 1973 (won by Roosevelt F.C.) and the Torneo de Veteranos 1973 (won by Arqueros Verdes-Caribes). Luis Raúl Cotto was the 1973 Footballer of the Year.

The national program became active leading up to the 1974 Central American and Caribbean Games, winning exhibitions over Don Bosco (5-2), a select of foreign players (2-1) and a Brazilian Navy team A (5-1). The Universidad Interamericana de San Germán won its second consecutive LAI title. The team did not win a game, losing close games against Nicaragua (1-2) and Barbados (0-2). Afterwards, the national team participated in Olimpiada Jíbara tournament held by the Urban Renewal and Housing Corporation of Puerto Rico (CRUV) and played exhibitions against the Spanish team Iberia. Brujos de Guayama won the 1974 Copa Don Bosco by defeating the host team, 2-1. Don Bosco defeated Club Los Andes (2-0) to win the Primera División. Guayama won the 1974 Primera División. Bernardo Pillot was the Footballer of the Year, having scored 26 goals. With Cordero as its vice-president, the FPF managed to gain television exposure with a show airing on Telemundo. Academia Quintana defeated Yabuco 4-H (2-0) to win the 1975 Primera División. Atlético Guamaní defeated Cantera Stars (3-2) to win the Segunda División. Guayama defeated Nemesio Canales to win the BF title. Interamericana San Germán won its third consecutive LAI title. The Housing Department's II Olimpiada Jíbara included a BF tournament (won by Humacao), while other tournaments like the Copa Gobernador and Copa Alcalde were organized by the government. The national team defeated a team from the Spanish Navy 7-1 and faced the New York Cosmos led by Pelé in exhibitions.

By 1976, the Baby-Fútbol class had grown to 329 teams and over 4,000 players, being won by Atlético Guayamés. The youth national was active in exhibitions leading up to CONCACAF action, which included a 1-1 tie against Aruba. While the Primera División tournament was taking place, Sunoloco de Yabucoa also defeated New York's Colchester Junior Club 5-2. Atlético Guayamés also won this class, securing the title with a 0-0 draw against Academia Quintana. Club Los Andes won the Segunda División over Sunoloco (1-0). Tulier was once again elected 1976 Footballer of the Year. During the offseason, the national team defeated HMCS Bonaventura (5-3) and Federico C (4-1). Berti García and Gilberto Monroig received recognitions by the AFA at the Olympic Dinner. Colegio San Ignacio won the 1977 Torneo Juvenil over Robinson School (4-0). The AFA organized the Torneo Preparatorio Joaquin Soria Terrazas, a preparatory event for the Primera División, which was won by El Ramanso over Roosevelt (1-0). A 12-14 national team was assembled and competed against a counterpart from the Dominican Republic, winning 2-1 and recording a draw (3-3). Atlético Guayamés won the 1977 Primera División, with the title being decided by goal differential against Yabuco 4-H. Don Bosco won the Juvenil (15-18) championship winning the title undefeated, while Guayama also won the Baby Fútbol. The federation season also included the 1977 Copa Gobernador, won by Roosevelt. Abroad, Javier Guerra Aponte was part of the team that won the 1978 Orange Bowl at Massachusetts. Francisco Guerra played with Salamanca in the Spanish second division.

The 1978 season opened with Don Bosco Jr. defeating Cruz Azul de Carolina (3-1) for the Copa Don Bosco. In preparation for the CACGs the national team held exhibitions that included wins over a foreign selection (3-1) and the Bahamian national team (4-1). Quintana won the 1978 Primera División by defeating the Sunoloco (4-2). Edwin Cáceres was the Footballer of the Year. At the 1979 Pan American Games, Puerto Rico defeated the Dominican Republic (1-0) but was later eliminated with losses to Brazil and Costa Rica. Afterwards, the national team defeated Saint Martin (5-1). In the Primera División Remanso defeated Atlético América (5-0) to win the title. The team also won the 1979 Copa Gobernador and played exhibition games against Grand Unique (1-1) and Universidad de Caracas (4-1). In the youth categories, Don Bosco Jr. won the Juvenil. Abroad, the pre-Juvenil national team won its second consecutive Orange Bowl at Miami. Academia Quintana won the 1980 Copa Alcalde over Club Nacional (3-1). The YaMa Sun Oil won the Primera División first round, eventually winning the entire tournament. The national program was active, with a U19 national team coached by Joe Serralta defeating the crew of the Argentine frigate Libertad(6-2) and Springfield University (3-2), also tying with Curran-Jones FC (1-1) and Gus and Paul's FC (3-3). Roberto Santana was the 1981 Footballer of the Year. In 1982, San Juan won the Baby Fútbol, Infantil, Pre-Juvenil and Juvenil categories.

At the 1982 Central American and Caribbean Games, Puerto Rico defeated Bahamas 4-1, finishing third in its group. In the qualification rounds for the Pan American Games, the national team lost two close games to Surinam (2-3, 0-1). In the Primera División, Quintana won the first round undefeated, but was displaced by the Brujos de Guayama who won their second consecutive title. In 1983, Felo León led Guayama to the Primera División title, finishing the season as the league's goal leader. Academia Quintana won the 1984 Primera División tournament. In the Juvenil category, Don Bosco championship over Guayama. The following year the FPF, then lead by Esteban Rodríguez Estrella, created a football school for children aged 10-15. National program standout Roberto Santana joined the University of Long Island at New York, serving as its Captain. He also joined a Pan American team of players from that state, playing a series at Colombia and being named its MVP. Afterwards, Santana played in the New York Cosmopolitan League. In the youth leagues, Pumas de Roosevelt won the Mini-Baby Fútbol and the Pitufos de Nacional the Baby-Fútbol at the Copa de Oro. Club Nacional won the Torneo Infantil and Don Bosco the Torneo Pre-Juvenil. Universidad del Sagrado Corazón (USC) won the 1984 LAI tournament. The municipality of San Juan and Wesleyan Church organized the Copa Fraternidad, won by the Pumas.

In 1985, Brujos de Guayama won the Primera División. The Copa de Oro was also played in the youth categories, while this year the municipality of San Juan organized the Copa Alcalde and Copa Navidad (both won by Cruz Azul de San Juan). The national team lost two its opening marches at the 1986 Central American and Caribbean Games, being eliminated from the competition. Academia Quintana won the 1986 Primera División. The FPF also joined the municipality of San Juan to sanction the Torneo Navidad in the Infantil category. By the second half of the 1980s football had yet to gain a place of serious sociocultural influence in Puerto Rico, contrasting with most of the region. In May 1987, a Football Festival was organized in conjunction with the visit of the king of Spain to Puerto Rico. The Brujos de Guayama won the Primera División. The Copa San Juan Bautista, Copa de Oro, Copa Puerto Rico and Copa Navidad were also sanctioned during the season. The 1988 Primera División was won by Academia Quintana. The FPF also sanctioned the 1988 Baby-Fútbol Copa de Oro and the Fútbol Sala '88 futsal tournament. In 1989, Academia Quintana won the title in a year where the island was struck by hurricane Hugo and traveled abroad to play exhibitions afterwards. The club also won the U16 youth tournament, the U12 Copa Navidad, the U19 Juvenil and finished second in the Metro region after losing to eventual national champion Atlético Fraigcomar in the U10. That year UPR-RP won the LAI tournament undefeated. Other federative events include the Copa Primavera and Copa Gobernador.

=== 1990-2010 ===
Brujos de Guayama won the 1990 Copa Don Bosco. The U10 Mini-Fútbol began with the Copa Primavera 1990, which was won by Atlético Fraigcomar. That year, the government spending on football was reduced. The national program continued active by organizing a youth team, which eon a game against its Haitian counterpart (1-0). The U23 lost a series against Jamaica in the Olympic qualifying. Guayama defeated Academia Quintana for the Copa Alcalde '90. Atlético Guayamés defeated Quintana (4-2) to win the Primera División. In the Segunda División, the Bucaneros de Arroyo defeated Tiburones de Aguadilla (1-0) to win the title. UPR-RP defeated USC (7-2) to win the LAI tournament. Other events sanctioned this year included the Baby-Fútbol Copa Mundial, Copa Amistad Internacional, Copa Cristóbal Colón and Copa Alcalde San Germán. Puerto Rico was an inaugural member of the CONCACAF. Carlos García was selected Footballer of the Year. The V Copa Fraigcomar was won by Deportivo Español, which later participated at the V Copa Cristóbal Colón at Caracas, Venezuela. Puerto Rico sent a team to the 1991 FIFUSA Futsal World Championship. In 1991, Guayama repeated as champion of the Primera División, while the Criollos de Caguas won the Segunda División. Academia Quintana won the U12 Baby-Fútbol Copa de Oro, while Atlético Fraigcomar won the U17 Pre-Juvenil class. A Masters class league was held at Ocean Park. The national program fielded a team for the Torneo Juvenil del Caribe, the U18 team defeated Anguilla (1-0) in the CONCACAF Youth Tournament and the U17 team competed world qualifiers. The senior team participated in the Copa Shell del Caribe, while another won the Copa Alaska-Rusia-Puerto Rico defeating defeating Alaska (5-0) and Russia (1-0).

In 1992, Bucaneros de Arroyo won the Primera División. In the youth divisions, Atléticos Fraigconar won the U10 Mini-Baby tournament, Deportivo Español won the U14 Copa Primavera and Quintana the U17 Pre-Juvenil. In the 1992 World Cup qualifying, Puerto Rico defeated the Dominican Republic twice (2-1), eliminating them from competition. However, the COPUR opted to suspend the FPF president Roberto Monroig, citing the team's composition. UPR-RP defeated RUM (1-0) to win the LAI. Club Unión won the Masters league. On February 3, 1993, the COPUR ended the suspension of the FPF. The Bucaneros de Arroyo won the Primera División for its second straight title. In the youth leagues, Academia Quintana won the U20 tournament, Colegio San Ignacio the Escolar-Superior and Don Bosco won the Copa Don Bosco. UPR-RP won the LAI tournament by defeating UPR-RUM (2-0). Both the senior and U23 team were active during the 1993 season. The adult select competed in the Caribbean Shell Cup, defeating Saint Marteen (3-0), later playing in the 1993 Central American and Caribbean Games. In the first edition of the Central American and Caribbean Cup, the U20 Puerto Rico national team defeated Costa Rica on penalties (5-3) but were eliminated from contention off court due to a protest.

In the 1994 Caribbean Shell Cup, Puerto Rico defeated Guyana (3-0), Barbados (1-0), Cayman Islands (2-0) and Martinique (3-0), losing to Saint Cristobal (1-0) and Jamaica (1-0). Don Bosco won the Primera División by defeating Academia Quintana in penalties (4-3). In the youth categories, Club Nacional de Carolina won the U17 Pre Juvenil by defeating Academia Quintana (1-0). The Fútbol Sala tournament ended being decided by technical committee, when Quintana and Don Bosco finished the final tied 5-5. That year, Puerto Rico sent a team to the Futsal World Cup. That year, the Puerto Rico Islanders received the FPF approval to compete at the United States International Soccer League (USISL). UPR-RUM won the 1994 LAI tournament by defeating UPR-RP twice in the final series (2-1, 1-0). The Puerto Rico Invitational Beach Soccer Cup 1994 held at Villas del Mar Hau, Isabela marked the first event in this modality in the island. Academia Quintana won the 1995 Primera División. The Puerto Rico Islanders played their first USISL season in 1995, with Hiram Bithorn Stadium as base, where it defeated the Chattanooga Express (3-1) to win its first home game. UPR-RP defeated UPR-RUM in the final series (3-2, 1-0) to win the 1995 LAI title.

A series of internal conflicts within the FPF led to FIFA intervening to normalize the situation. Despite this, the national program fielded a team for the 1998 World Cup qualifiers. Academia Quintana won the Primera División undefeated, as well as the Mini-Baby and Futsal leagues. Don Bosco won the U12 Copa Alcalde, Nacinal de Carolina won the Copa Don Bosco and the U17 league, while Academia Quintana the U9 Copa Primavera. UPR-RP defeated UPR-RUM to win the 1996 LAI tournament. In 1997, a splinter group created a non-affiliated league named Liga Mayor de Fútbol Nacional (LMFN) de Puerto Rico. Quintana won the Primera División for the third year in a row. UPR-RP repeated the title, defeating UPR-RUM in the final series (2-0, 1-0). For 1998, the Copa Federación represented the Primera División and was won by Nacional de Carolina. In the youth categories, the federation organized the Mundialito Puerto Rico, won by Fraigcomar. The San Juan Islanders relocated from Toa Baja for the LMFN, winning their first championship. Afterwards, the team travelled to Mexico for the Torneo Internacional del Deporte de los Trabajadores del Fútbol, defeating a Mexican, Belgian and Costa Rican team before finishing third. UPR-RUM won the LAI title by defeating UPR-RP (3-0, confiscation). The DE sanctioned the scholar tournaments, won by Escuela Superior Manuel Ortiz Fulla in 10-11 and 17-20, while Escuela Segunda Unidad Asución Lugo won in 12-13. On the PRHSAA, Wesleyan won. The national team won their 1998 Copa Navidad, defeating the Jamrock club from the BVI and a veterans team. Club América won the Masters league. In 1999 Club Alianza won in the Masters category. The San Juan Islanders won their second consecutive LMFN title. UPR-RP won the LAI by defeating Interamerican University at San Germán (UIA) in three games (1-2, 2-1 and 1-0). Academia Quintana won the boys and Águilas de San Juan the girls at the U12 Copa de Oro. At the turn of the century, the FPF continued experimenting internal power struggles and the national program was unable to find success in the 2002 World Cup qualifiers. The federation also clashed with another splinter group, the Asociación Central de Balónpie(ACB), which grew to include the COPUR and the legislature.

Liga Atlética Fraigcomar won the 2000 Masters League. The boys youth categories from U6 to U10 were won by Fraigcomar, with Don Bosco winning the U12 and Mayaguez the U17. In the girls competition, Las Atléticas won the sole U12 division. Club Sporting de San Juan won the U17 Space Coast Cup at Cocoa, Florida, defeating the South West Chiefs (2-1) in the semifinal and Coral Estates Club (2-1) to finish undefeated. Sirenas de Ocean Park won the women's tournament. UPR-RP defeated UPR-RUM (4-1) to win the 2000 LAI title. The Torneo de Fútbol Escolar unified both public and private high schools, being won by Colegio San Ignacio. The 1999 Primera División was weakened by the LMFN, ultimately resuming in 2000. By this time, football continued as a niche sport, being loosely covered and not receiving academic study or scrutiny. The effects of the government's lack of support during the first half of the 20th Century marked the rest of the 1990s and prevented the creation of a massive hincha culture as seen throughout the region, plunging it into a longstanding phase of crisis.

== National team ==
Since its foundation, the Puerto Rico national football team has been one of the least successful teams in the world. It did not even enter the qualification stage for the 2006 World Cup. Its highest FIFA ranking was 97 in March 1994, and its lowest was 202 in November 2004. Until 2008, Puerto Rico had not fielded a national team since 2004 when they lost 5–2 to Grenada. The last time they had won a match was in 1993 when they won 4–0 against the Cayman Islands.

After a four-year absence, the Puerto Rican national team re-emerged on 16 January 2008, with a 2–0 victory in a friendly match against Bermuda. This was played in preparation for a World Cup qualifier against the Dominican Republic, scheduled for 26 March 2008, which Puerto Rico won 1–0.

== Club football ==
Club football had been a very limited affair involving a handful of amateur teams in several separate leagues. As the domestic game has grown in popularity, this started to change. The Puerto Rico Islanders began to play in the USL First Division, the second tier of football in the United States at the time, and, in 2008, the first ever unified competition, the Puerto Rico Soccer League, was established. Many clubs on the island are now affiliated with larger teams in some of the world's major football leagues.

In 2011, club football teams on the island made another monumental leap. The Puerto Rico Islanders joined the North American Soccer League, which is the new second tier of football in the United States. In addition, Puerto Rico United, Club Atlético River Plate Puerto Rico and Sevilla FC Puerto Rico moved to USL Pro, the new third tier of football in the United States. The Puerto Rico Soccer League held a 2011 season. However, the PRSL folded after the 2011 season, making the Liga Nacional de Fútbol de Puerto Rico the top-tier league, even though it is an amateur league. The LNFPR split into a First Division and Second Division in order to fill the void left by PRSL. Seeking to restructure professional football in Puerto Rico, the PRFF was planning for the Liga Profesional de Fútbol de Puerto Rico, which was supposed to start in 2013.

== Attendances ==
The football club from Puerto Rico with the highest average home league attendance per league season:

Club	Season	Games	Total	Average
Puerto Rico FC	2016	11	41,811	3,801

Source: League page on Wikipedia

== Puerto Rican association football leagues and associations ==
- Puerto Rican football league system
- Liga Nacional de Fútbol de Puerto Rico (defunct)
- Campeonato Nacional de Fútbol de Puerto Rico (defunct)
- Liga Mayor de Fútbol Nacional (defunct)
- Puerto Rico Soccer League (defunct)
- Liga Puerto Rico Pro
- Puerto Rican Football Federation

== Puerto Rican teams ==
- Puerto Rico men's national football team
- Puerto Rico women's national football team
