= Chris Megaloudis =

Puerto Rican international footballer (born 1984)

Personal information
- Full name: Christopher Megaloudis
- Date of birth: May 4, 1984 (age 42)
- Place of birth: Astoria, New York, United States
- Height: 6 ft 0 in (1.83 m)
- Position: Forward

Team information
- Current team: Molloy Lions (Head coach)

Youth career
- 1998–2002: Monsignor McClancy

College career
Years	Team	Apps	(Gls)
2002–2003	Saint Peter's Peacocks		
2004–2005	Stony Brook Seawolves		

Senior career*
Years	Team	Apps	(Gls)
2004	Brooklyn Knights	16	(4)
2006	Long Island Rough Riders	12	(2)
2007	Westchester Flames	7	(2)
2008	New York Red Bulls	1	(0)
2009	Long Island Rough Riders	3	(0)
2010	Radnički Obrenovac	8	(3)
2011	River Plate Puerto Rico	5	(0)
2011	F.C. New York	4	(0)
2012	Long Island Rough Riders	6	(0)
2013	Greek American AA	12	(0)

International career
2008–2012	Puerto Rico	20	(6)

Managerial career
- 2012–2016: Nassau Lions (women's assistant)
- 2017–2022: Nassau Lions (women's)
- 2022–2024: Adelphi Panthers (Men's assistant)
- 2024–: Long Island Rough Riders (Men's)
- 2024–: Molloy Lions (Men's)
- * Club domestic league appearances and goals

Christopher Megaloudis (born May 14, 1984) is a Puerto Rican football coach and former player. He made 20 appearances for the Puerto Rico national team scoring six goals.

== Club career ==
=== Youth career ===
Chris played soccer in high school at Monsignor McClancy Memorial High School. He is the school's all-time leading goal scorer. For all of his goal-scoring accomplishments, Christopher was named as team Most Valuable Player after his freshman, junior, and senior years. Throughout his high school career, the Crusaders won the Brooklyn-Queens Championship four times, losing only one game along the way (a span that saw the team go undefeated in 56 league games). In Christopher's sophomore season, the team advanced to the City Championship game. In his junior season, the Crusaders once again progressed to the City Championship game, this time defeating Salesian 2–0, a season that saw the Crusaders outscore their opponents by a staggering 100-17 goals with a school best 14-2-1 record. In his senior year, the team compiled a record of 16–3, falling in a penalty shootout to Saint Joseph's by the Sea in Staten Island. Christopher received recognition as a City All-Star first team member from the C.H.S.A.A. coaches all four years as well as by the Daily News, Newsday, and various local newspapers.

=== Professional career ===
Following his college career, Megaloudis joined the Long Island Rough Riders of the PDL on a full-time basis. In 2007 Megaloudis joined semi-pro club New York Pancyprian-Freedoms of the Eastern New York League (ENYSASA) and helped lead the club past the first round of the U.S. Open Cup. He later joined the PDL's Westchester Flames.

In January 2008, Megaloudis went on trial with New York Red Bulls of Major League Soccer. He was signed by the club in March 2008, and made his full professional debut for the Red Bulls on June 18, 2008, in a game against the New England Revolution. He was waived by New York Red Bulls on September 15, 2008.

In 2009, Sevilla FC Puerto Rico of the Puerto Rico Soccer League signed Megaloudis to the club near the end of the 2009 Puerto Rico Soccer League Playoffs. In January 2010 he joined club Radnički Obrenovac in Serbia third league.

He signed with River Plate Puerto Rico but the team soon folded. After he left and signed with FC New York until the end of the USL Pro 2011 Season. He played just four games for F.C. New York, during the 2011 USL Professional Division season and joined in November the same year to USL Premier Development League club Long Island Rough Riders. Megaloudis played six games for Long Island, before moved to Cosmopolitan Soccer League side Greek American AA.

== International career ==
Megaloudis scored his first international goal for Puerto Rico against Trinidad and Tobago on January 26, 2008. He scored his second goal against Honduras in a World Cup Qualifier, which ended in a 2–2 draw.

== Personal life ==
Megaloudis works since his retirement as FIFA Player agent for Washington, District Of Columbia based agency James Grant Sports. He now coaches at Nassau Community College. This season his team went all the way to the NJCAA National Championship where they placed 4th in the nation.

=== Family ===
Megaloudis is eligible to play for Puerto Rico because his mother Carmen is Puerto Rican. His father Michael is of Greek descent but played for Puerto Rico in the 1990s. His grandfather Demosthenes played in the 40s active soccer and was during this time, member of the Greek American AA, whose brother Steve Megaloudis, was a player too. His uncle Nicky Megaloudis played in the 80s, active in the North American Soccer League (NASL) and MISL. His Cousins and sons of Nick, George and Dino, played professionally in Greece. George played in the Super League Greece for AO Chania, while Dino was a member of the Greece national U-16 and U-20 side. Another uncle Gus, played also for the reserve side of Greek American AA. His cousin Nicole was in the Women Soccer Team of Virginia Commonwealth University Rams, before she died in a car crash Goochland County, Virginia in 2004.

== Career statistics ==
Scores and results list Puerto Rico's goal tally first.

No	Date	Venue	Opponent	Score	Result	Competition
1.	26 January 2008	Juan Ramón Loubriel Stadium, Bayamón, Puerto Rico	Trinidad and Tobago	2–0	2–2	Friendly
2.	14 June 2008	Juan Ramón Loubriel Stadium, Bayamón, Puerto Rico	Honduras	1–1	2–2	2010 FIFA World Cup qualification
3.	2 October 2010	Juan Ramón Loubriel Stadium, Bayamón, Puerto Rico	Anguilla	2–0	3–1	2010 Caribbean Cup qualification
4.	2 October 2010	Juan Ramón Loubriel Stadium, Bayamón, Puerto Rico	Anguilla	3–1	3–1	2010 Caribbean Cup qualification
5.	6 October 2010	Juan Ramón Loubriel Stadium, Bayamón, Puerto Rico	Cayman Islands	1–0	2–0	2010 Caribbean Cup qualification
6.	24 October 2010	Grenada National Stadium, St. George's, Grenada	Guadeloupe	1–3	2–3	2010 Caribbean Cup qualification
