= Gustavo López (footballer, born 1983) =

Argentine footballer

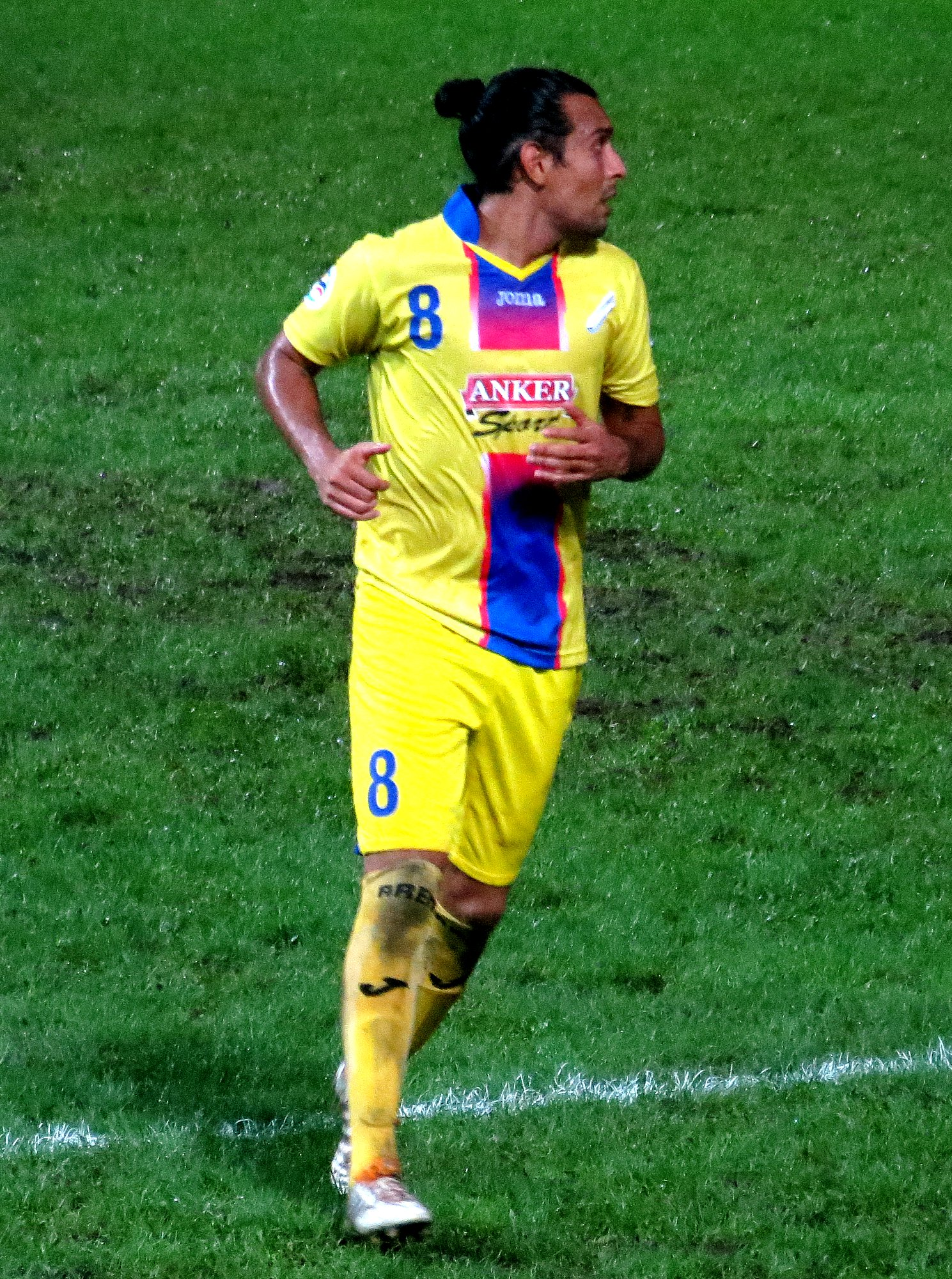
- Gustavo López playing for Arema in 2014

Personal information
- Full name: Gustavo Fabián López
- Date of birth: 28 April 1983 (age 43)
- Place of birth: Isidro Casanova, Argentina
- Height: 1.80 m (5 ft 11 in)
- Position: Attacking midfielder

Senior career*
Years	Team	Apps	(Gls)
2002–2005	Lanús	8	(0)
2006–2007	Persela Lamongan	23	(5)
2008–2009	Budućnost Podgorica	32	(3)
2011–2013	Persela Lamongan	46	(12)
2013–2014	Arema Cronus	26	(8)
2014–2016	Terengganu FA	20	(4)
2018	PS TIRA	12	(2)
- * Club domestic league appearances and goals as of 11 July 2018

Gustavo Fabián López (born April 28, 1983) is an Argentine retired footballer who played as an attacking midfielder.

He previously played in Argentine Primera División, and in the top leagues of Venezuela, Indonesia, Malaysia, El Salvador, Puerto Rico, and Montenegro.

== Honours ==
=== Club honors ===
Budućnost Podgorica

- Montenegrin First League (1): 2007–08

River Plate Puerto Rico

- Puerto Rico Soccer League (1): 2010
- Puerto Rico Soccer League Regular Season Cup (1): 2009

Arema Cronus

- East Java Governor Cup (1): 2013
