= Yaikel Pérez =

Cuban footballer (born 1985)

Personal information
- Full name: Yaikel Pérez
- Date of birth: February 17, 1985 (age 41)
- Place of birth: Havana, Cuba
- Height: 6 ft 0 in (1.83 m)
- Position: Striker

Youth career
- Ciudad Habana

Senior career*
Years	Team	Apps	(Gls)
2006	Miami FC	6	(1)
2007	Laredo Heat	3	(0)
2007	Atlético de San Juan	9	(4)
2008–2009	Sevilla Puerto Rico	48	(16)
2010	Crystal Palace Baltimore	17	(1)
2011	River Plate Puerto Rico	3	(1)
2011	Puerto Rico Islanders	14	(1)
2012	Alianza	15	(4)
2012	Aguila	18	(5)
2013–2014	Fort Lauderdale Strikers	16	(3)
2015	Đà Nẵng	14	(6)
2017	Harrisburg Heat (indoor)	10	(3)
- * Club domestic league appearances and goals as of October 13, 2015

Yaikel Pérez Rousseaux (born February 17, 1985) is a Cuban football player who most recently played for MASL side Harrisburg Heat. He was terminated midseason for fighting

== Career ==
=== Club ===
Perez played youth soccer for his local club, Ciudad Habana, and was part of the Cuba national team which qualified for the 2005 CONCACAF Gold Cup. Along with several of his teammates he defected to the United States during the final qualifying phase, and eventually signed for USL First Division expansion team Miami FC in 2006.

After being released by Miami Perez briefly played for Laredo Heat in the USL Premier Development League before moving to Puerto Rico, where he played for Atlético de San Juan and Sevilla FC Puerto Rico in the new Puerto Rico Soccer League from 2007 to 2009, making 48 appearances and scoring 16 goals for Sevilla, and helping them to the league title in 2008.

On March 9, 2010, Crystal Palace Baltimore announced the signing of Perez to a contract for the 2010 season. Perez played 17 games and scored 1 goal for Baltimore before the team ceased operations at the end of the season.

He transferred to River Plate Puerto Rico in the USL Professional Division in 2011, but played just three games before the team was removed from USL Pro due to financial difficulties. He moved to Puerto Rico Islanders in the North American Soccer League in June, and made his debut for his new team on June 1 in a 1–1 tie with the NSC Minnesota Stars.

In January 2017, Pérez joined MASL side Harrisburg Heat.

== Career statistics ==
(correct as of 15 August 2010)

Club	Season	League			Cup			Play-Offs			Total		
Club	Season	Apps	Goals	Assists	Apps	Goals	Assists	Apps	Goals	Assists	Apps	Goals	Assists
Miami	2006	6	1	?	?	?	?	-	-	-	6	1	?
Total	2009	6	1	?	?	?	?	-	-	-	6	1	?
Crystal Palace Baltimore	2010	17	1	1	1	0	0	-	-	-	18	1	1
Total	2010–present	17	1	1	1	0	0	-	-	-	18	1	1
Career Total	2006–present	23	2	1	1	0	0	-	-	-	24	2	1
