= Daniel Ojeda =

Colombian footballer (born 1986)

Personal information
- Full name: Daniel Ojeda
- Date of birth: February 23, 1986 (age 40)
- Place of birth: Santa Marta, Colombia
- Height: 5 ft 11 in (1.80 m)
- Position: Defender

Team information
- Current team: Bayamon FC

Senior career*
Years	Team	Apps	(Gls)
2005–2006	Academia		
2007–2009	Puerto Rico Islanders	22	(0)
2009	→ Bayamon FC (loan)	16	(0)
2010–	Bayamon FC	2	(0)
- * Club domestic league appearances and goals as of 20 October 2009

Daniel Ojeda (born February 23, 1986) is a Colombian soccer player. He currently plays for Bayamon FC in the Puerto Rico Soccer League.

== Career ==
Ojeda began his career playing for the Bogotá-based club Academia in the Colombian Categoría Primera B, before moving to the Puerto Rico Islanders in 2007. He played primarily on the Islanders’ reserve team in his debut season, before being called up to the first team in 2008; he has since made over 20 appearances, helping the Islanders win the 2008 USL First Division regular season title and progress to the semi-finals of the CONCACAF Champions League 2008–09. In 2009, Ojeda's playing time with the Puerto Rico Islanders decreased and he was loaned out to Bayamon FC in the Puerto Rico Soccer League. In 2010, he made his official move with Bayamon FC, terminating his contract with the Puerto Rico Islanders.

== Honors ==
=== Club ===
==== Puerto Rico Islanders ====
- USL First Division Championship runners-up: 2008
- Commissioner's Cup: 2008
- CFU Club Championship runner-up: 2009

==== Bayamon FC ====
- Puerto Rico Soccer League PlayOff Cup: 2009
