= Julio Maya =

Cuban footballer

Personal information
- Full name: Julio César Maya Cruz
- Date of birth: 19 September 1985 (age 41)
- Place of birth: Havana, Cuba
- Height: 1.76 m (5 ft 9 in)
- Position: Forward

Team information
- Current team: River Plate Puerto Rico

Senior career*
Years	Team	Apps	(Gls)
2003–2005	La Habana	0	(0)
2007	Cortuluá	12	(4)
2008–2009	Sevilla Puerto Rico	30	(22)
2010	Miami FC	0	(0)
2010	Atlético Marte	1	(2)
2011–2012	River Plate Puerto Rico	3	(0)
2012–2013	Bayamón FC		
- * Club domestic league appearances and goals as of 2009-12-26

Julio César Maya Cruz (born 19 September 1985) is a Cuban association football player who played as a forward for River Plate Puerto Rico in the USL Professional Division.

== Club career ==
He was the top goal scorer for Sevilla FC in the 2009 Puerto Rico season with 22 goals.
