= 2017 Caguas Sporting FC season =

Caguas Sporting FC
2017 season
- Head Coach: Oscar Rosa
- Highest home attendance: League:
- Lowest home attendance: League:
- Average home league attendance: League:

The 2017 Caguas Sporting FC season is the club's second season of existence. The club will play in the Puerto Rico Soccer League, the first tier of the Puerto Rico soccer pyramid.

== Pre-season ==
=== Don Bosco Cup ===
The 2017 Caguas Sporting FC team will be participating in the Don Bosco Cup as preseason.

==== Matches ====
February 8, 2017 1	Caguas Sporting FC	1–2	Don Bosco FC	San Juan
8:00 PM				Stadium: Cantera Football Park; Attendance: --

February 10, 2017 3	Caguas Sporting FC	0–0	Metropolitan FA - B	San Juan
8:00 PM				Stadium: Cantera Football Park; Attendance: --

February 17, 2017 3	Caguas Sporting FC	v	Atléticos de San Juan	San Juan
0:00 PM				Attendance: --

== PRSL ==
=== Matches ===
April 9, 2017 1	Caguas Sporting FC	2–4	GPS Puerto Rico	San Juan
0:00 PM	Olvin Ortiz 0', 0'	Report	0' Javier de la Rosa; 0' Alberto "Picky" Montesinos; 0' Eric Rosario; 0' Anthony Martinez	Stadium: Estadio Metropolitina; Attendance: --

== Copa Luis Villarejo ==
The 2017 Copa Luis Villarejo schedule has not been announced.
