= Ricardo Alcerro =

Honduran footballer (born 1973)

Ricardo Ahmed Alcerro Marad
Personal information
- Full name: Ricardo Ahmed Alcerro Marad
- Date of birth: 11 May 1973 (age 53)
- Place of birth: Tegucigalpa, Honduras
- Height: 5 ft 8 in (1.73 m)
- Position: Attacking midfielder

Youth career
- 1983–1985: Necaxa
- 1986–1990: Melgar

Senior career*
Years	Team	Apps	(Gls)
1991-1992	Allin Color	14	(0)
1992	Real Maya (loan)	3	(0)
1993–1994	Miami Tango	26	(7)
1995–1996	Florida Strikers	16	(12)
1996	Miami Tango (loan)	28	(16)
1997-1998	Raleigh Flyers	28	(8)
1999-2000	New Orleans Storm	30	(8)
2000	Real C.D. España	12	(2)
2000-2001	Pumas UNAH	14	(0)
2001-2002	Cincinnati Riverhawks	22	(8)
2003	Sestri Levante	13	(4)
2004-2005	Puerto Rico Islanders	28	(4)
2008	Guaynabo Fluminense FC	22	(5)
2009	Atlético de San Juan FC	22	(4)
Total		278	(78)

International career
1989	Honduras U17	4	(2)
1991	Honduras U19		

Managerial career
- 2015–: Inter Usa Academy
- 2014: United States Soccer Federation
- 2012-2013: Miami United FC
- 2009: Atlético de San Juan FC
- 2008: Guaynabo Fluminense FC
- * Club domestic league appearances and goals

Ricardo Alcerro (born 11 May 1973) is a Honduran former footballer with over 20 years of professional playing experience throughout various countries.

== Career ==
Alcerro, nicknamed The Magician as he is best known in soccer, was selected to take part in MLS Combine for the Miami Fusion in 1998. He ended his playing career in the Puerto Rico Soccer League with Guaynabo Fluminense FC as a player/assistant coach in 2008. He was signed as a head coach and general manager with Miami United for the 2012/2013 season. In 2014, he started a United States Soccer Federation former U14-16-18 USYMNT) scouting network. In January 2017, he was named the director of football for the Inter USA Academy. In July 2018, he was named the club's new Manager. He also became the new technical advisor at the Inter USA Academy.
