= Walter Zermatten =

Argentine footballer

Personal information
- Full name: Walter Fabián Zermatten
- Date of birth: 14 October 1971 (age 55)
- Place of birth: Isidro Casanova, Argentina
- Position: Midfielder

Team information
- Current team: Cañuelas Fútbol Club

Senior career*
Years	Team	Apps	(Gls)
1992–1994	Argentinos Juniors	20	(1)
1994–1995	Instituto		
1995–1996	Andino Sport Club		
1996–1997	Temperley		
1997–1999	Banfield		
1999	Defensores de Belgrano		
2000	Querétaro		
2001–2002	Deportivo Quito		
2002	Técnico Universitario		
2004	Deportivo Táchira		
2005	Dinamo Tirana		
2005	The Strongest		
2006	C.D.Argentino Monte Maíz (Argentina)		
2006–2008	Club Sportivo Rivadavia (Venado Tuerto)		
2008–	River Plate PR		
- * Club domestic league appearances and goals

Walter Fabián Zermatten (born 14 October 1971 in Isidro Casanova) is an Argentine footballer who coaches the River Plate PR in the Puerto Rico Soccer League. He is married and is the father of two. As a player, he made his professional debut at the age of 21. After playing for the River Plate PR he became their coach in 2009.

== Club career ==
Zermatten previously played for Argentinos Juniors in the Primera División Argentina. He also had a spell with Deportivo Quito in Serie A de Ecuador.
