= Gustavo Paruolo =

Argentine footballer

Personal information
- Date of birth: November 16, 1980 (age 45)
- Place of birth: Buenos Aires, Argentina
- Height: 1.75 m (5 ft 9 in)
- Position: Midfielder

Youth career
- 1999–2000: San Lorenzo

Senior career*
Years	Team	Apps	(Gls)
2000–2002	San Lorenzo	0	(0)
2001–2002	→ Almagro (loan)	11	(0)
2002–2003	Juventud Antoniana	27	(1)
2003–2004	Los Andes	27	(1)
2004	All Boys	2	(0)
2005	Nueva Chicago	6	(0)
2005–2006	La Plata FC	23	(3)
2006	Audax Italiano	16	(2)
2007–2009	Politehnica Iaşi	27	(1)
2009	Politehnica Iaşi II	–	(–)
2009	Deportivo Pasto	3	(0)
2011	River Plate Puerto Rico	1	(0)
Total		143	(8)
- * Club domestic league appearances and goals

Gustavo Alejandro Paruolo (born November 16, 1980) is an Argentine former professional footballer who played as a nidfielder.

== Career ==
Paruolo was born in Buenos Aires. He started his career with San Lorenzo. In 2001, he left San Lorenzo and spent several years playing in the lower leagues of Argentine football with Almagro, Juventud Antoniana, Los Andes, All Boys, Nueva Chicago and La Plata FC.

In 2006 Paruolo joined Audax Italiano in Chile before moving to Romania to play for Politehnica Iaşi.
