= Kareem Smith =

Trinidadian footballer

Personal information
- Full name: Carl Kareem Smith
- Date of birth: 18 January 1985 (age 41)
- Place of birth: Boston, Massachusetts, United States
- Height: 1.88 m (6 ft 2 in)
- Position: Centre back

College career
Years	Team	Apps	(Gls)
2003–2006	South Florida Bulls	75	(3)

Senior career*
Years	Team	Apps	(Gls)
2004–2006	Cape Cod Crusaders	21	(0)
2007	Rochester Raging Rhinos	20	(0)
2007	KÍ Klaksvík	18	(0)
2008–2009	United Petrotrin	47	(1)
2009–2011	FC Leones	18	(0)
2012	FC Tucson	12	(0)
2014–2015	San Juan Jabloteh	15	(0)
2015	Colorado Springs Switchbacks	8	(0)

International career^{‡}
2002–2003	United States U18	10	(0)
2003–2005	Trinidad and Tobago U20	10	(0)
2008–2012	Trinidad and Tobago	5	(0)

Managerial career
- 2012–2015: Beaver Country Day School Varsity
- * Club domestic league appearances and goals as of 14 September 2015 ‡ National team caps and goals as of 27 May 2012

Carl Kareem Smith (born 18 January 1985), known as Kareem Smith, is an American-born Trinidadian footballer who plays as a centre back for Colorado Springs Switchbacks in the USL Professional Division and for the Trinidad and Tobago national football team. Previously, he was playing in the TT Pro League for San Juan Jabloteh F.C. Prior to playing in Trinidad & Tobago, he played for Formuladeildin side KÍ Klaksvík as well as in the MLS Reserve League for New England Revolution reserves side. He is represented by Pan American Calcio. He currently coaches for the Junior Varsity Team in Norwood, Massachusetts.

== Career ==
=== Youth and college ===
In his youth, Smith was a member of the United States U18, the Region I Olympic Development Program (ODP) team and helped lead his club team, the South Shore United Blazers, to a U-15 Region I title and three Massachusetts state championships at each of the U-16 through U-18 levels. He also played as a guest player on the Fuller Hamlets in the San Diego Surf tournament in the U-19 Super Group where they advanced to the quarterfinals. Smith played high school soccer for Beaver Country Day school and in NCAA for the South Florida Bulls where he started at centre-back with Neven Subotic and later with Yohance Marshall.

Smith completed his college eligibility in 2006 after collecting Second Team All-BIG EAST accolades. Smith, who played and started in every match during his four-year USF career, helped anchor a defense which recorded a 0.80 GAA (ranking 25th in the nation). The Hyde Park, Mass., native earned BIG EAST Defensive Player of the Week honors (Sept. 4) for a strong defensive outing versus a pair of ACC foes (N.C. State and Duke). Smith holds the USF record for consecutive starts (75) and is tied for the school mark in career matches (75).

== Club career ==
On October 21, 2014, Smith signed a 2-year contract with USL Professional Division side, Colorado Springs Switchbacks.

== International career ==
Smith represented the United States at the U-17 and U-18 level. He later switched to the Trinidad & Tobago U-20 Men's National Team and in January 2008, made his debut for the Trinidad and Tobago national football team against Guyana. He is attempting to re-join the national team in hopes of entering the World Cup.

== Personal life ==
Smith is Trinidadian through his father & Bangladeshi through his mother. He has served as high school assistant coach for Beaver Country Day school, one of the top prep high school soccer teams in the country. He is also in the hall of fame at Beaver Country Day School due to his outstanding soccer career (when he attended Beaver Country Day School). He also professionally plays the steelpan.
