= Campeonato Nacional de Fútbol de Puerto Rico =

Football league in Puerto Rico

- Founded: 2005
- Folded: 2007
- Country: Puerto Rico

Campeonato Nacional de Fútbol de Puerto Rico was a football league in Puerto Rico, which was founded in 2005 and folded in 2007. It was an amateur league. This league became the first organized tournament to unify the domestic football scene established by the Puerto Rican Football Federation.

The league did not include the Puerto Rico Islanders, who for historical reasons played in the North American Soccer League, which was the second division in the United States and Canada from 2011 to 2017, when the league folded.

== History ==
During its three years of existence, all titles were won by Fraigcomar.

=== 2005 season ===
For the 2005 season, 2 groups of 8 teams participated.

==== Tables ====
Group 1
Pos	Team	Pld	W	D	L	GF	GA	GD	Pts
1	Quintana FC	4	3	0	1	5	1	+4	9
2	Huracanes de Caguas	4	3	0	1	3	2	+1	9
3	Magic de San Juan	3	1	0	2	3	3	0	3
4	Mayagüez FC	3	0	0	3	0	5	−5	0

Group 2
Pos	Team	Pld	W	D	L	GF	GA	GD	Pts
1	Fraigcomar	4	4	0	0	15	0	+15	12 (Note: Missed 1 goals for 1 match.)
2	Gigantes de Carolina	4	3	0	1	14	4	+10	9
3	Atleticos de Levittown	4	1	0	3	8	13	−5	3
4	Vaqueros de Bayamon	4	0	0	4	2	22	−20	0

==== Final ====
Location: Estadio Juan Ramón Loubriel, Bayamón

Date	Team 1	Score	Team 2
Dec 11	Fraigcomar	1–0	Huracanes

=== 2007 ===
- Fraigcomar
- San Juan Galaxy
- Caguas Huracán
- San Francisco Guaynabo
- Clube Atlético Levittown
- Tornados de Humacao

=== Folding ===
In 2008, the league was replaced as the highest level football league in the country by the Puerto Rico Soccer League, which was created by the Puerto Rican Football Federation to unify the domestic football scene, but only managed to get the attention of Liga Mayor teams, whilst most teams chose to stay in La Liga Premier, another amateur league.
