= Martín Morello =

Argentine footballer

Personal information
- Date of birth: 13 June 1983 (age 43)
- Place of birth: San Pedro, Buenos Aires, Argentina
- Height: 1.84 m (6 ft 0 in)
- Position: Midfielder

Team information
- Current team: Sportivo Baradero

Senior career*
Years	Team	Apps	(Gls)
2004–05	Independiente	9	(0)
2006	Unión Magdalena		
2006	SD Ponferradina	0	(0)
2007	Flandria	14	(0)
2007–08	Platense		
2009	Defensores Unidos		
2009–10	Ramonense		
2010–11	River Plate Puerto Rico		
2012–	Sportivo Baradero		
- * Club domestic league appearances and goals as of Sep 6, 2012

Martín Morello (born 13 June 1983 in San Pedro, Buenos Aires) is an Argentine footballer currently playing for River Plate Puerto Rico in the USL Professional Division.
