= Leones de Ponce (baseball) =

Professional baseball team in Ponce, Puerto Rico

- Logo

Information
- League: Roberto Clemente Professional Baseball League
- Location: Ponce, Puerto Rico
- Ballpark: Estadio Paquito Montaner
- Founded: 1938
- Nickname: Leones
- Caribbean Series championships: 1 (1972)
- League championships: 11 (1941/1942, 1942/1943, 1943/1944, 1944/1945, 1946 /1947, 1968/1969, 1969/1970, 1971/1972, 1981/1982, 2003/2004, 2008/2009
- Former name: Ponce Baseball Club
- Former league: Liga del Castillo
- Former ballpark: Campo Atlético Charles H. Terry
- Colors: Black and Red
- Mascot: Lion
- Ownership: Oscar Misla
- Manager: Andy González

Leones de Ponce (English: Lions) is a baseball team in the Liga de Béisbol Profesional Roberto Clemente (LBPRC). The organization is based in the municipality of Ponce, Puerto Rico. The team plays at the Francisco Montaner Stadium. Contrary to popular belief, the name Leones comes from their team owner being photographed with a whip as if taming lions. At one time, the "legendary" team scored a continuous run of thirteen championships. The team's owner is Oscar Misla, also owner of the Leones de Ponce in the Baloncesto Superior Nacional (BSN). The team's colors are black and red.

== History ==
=== Early years ===
Led by Francisco Coimbre, Tomás Quiñones, Juan Guilbe, José Santiago and Fernando Ramos, the Leones were the dominant team during the first decade of the professional league, with titles in 1942, 1943, 1944, 1945 and 1947.

On December 3, 1944, Tomás Quiñones threw the first no hitter for Ponce in a 8-0 win over Mayagüez.

On December 6, 1953, José Santiago pitched the fifth no-hitter in the LBPPR for Ponce, blanking San Juan 6-0.

In 1947, the Leones played against the New York Yankees as part of the eventual World Series champions’ preseason Latin American tour, which featured Ponce defeating the visiting team 12-8.

1949, Luis Antonio Morales became the narrator of the Leones, remaining in the role for half a century.

For the 1952-53 season, the Leones made an offer for Santiago Muratti, who had not played since Aguadilla was merged with San Juan the previous season. On November 30, 1952, the tandem of Hank Berham and Muratti where involved in the fourth no-hitter recorded in a game against Caguas. The team received $1,000 as a reward, which were distributed $500 for the pitcher, $300 for the catcher and $300 were split among the rest of the players. On January 18, 1953, Muratti caught both games in a double header, the first of which extended to 17 innings, for a total of 26 innings.

=== Puerto Rico Baseball League (2008–2012) ===
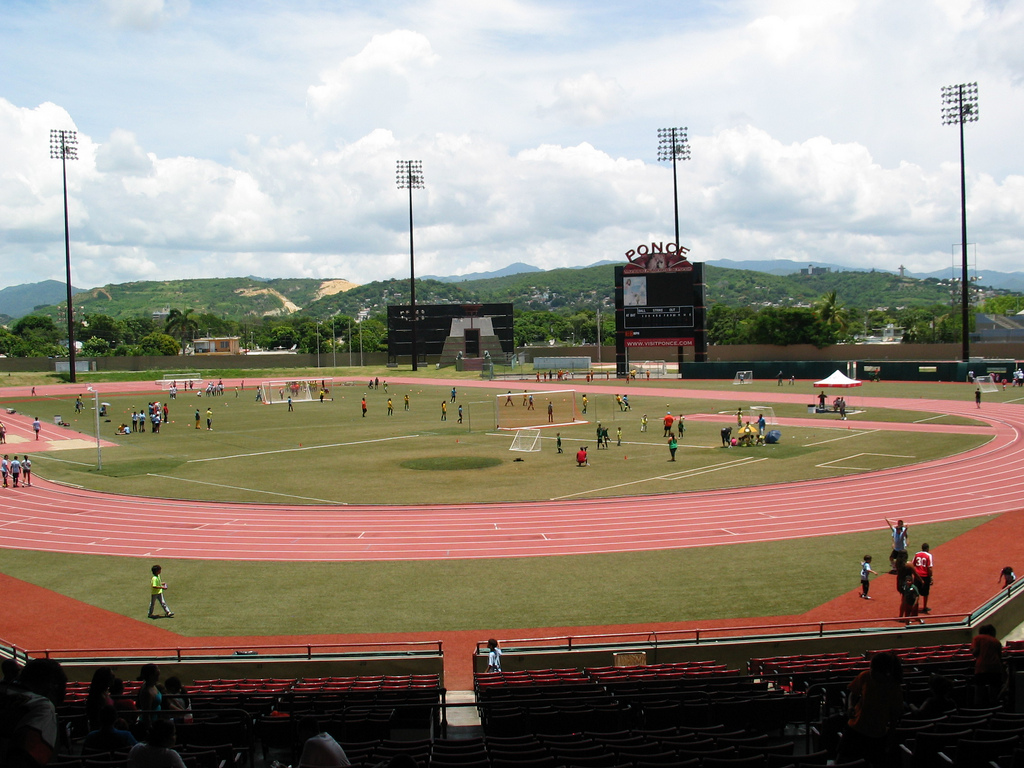
Estadio Paquito Montaner, Home venue for Leones de Ponce

After the suspension of the 2007-2008 season, the Liga de Béisbol Profesional de Puerto Rico reestablished itself, while doing several changes to its format. The Leones chose Eduardo Pérez, son of Tony Pérez, to coach the team during the season. The Leones were the first team to surpass twenty victories during the regular season, eventually concluding in the first place. For his team's performance, Eduardo Pérez won the award for "Manager of the Year", while Jorge Padilla was selected the league's Most Valuable Player.

After concluding the first two stages of the playoffs undefeated, the Leones were joined by the Lobos de Arecibo in the final bracket. In the final series, the team won the first game, before losing the second in Arecibo. The Leones then won three consecutive games, including the decisive contest before 15,000 fans in Ponce. With this streak, the team finished with a 12–1 record in the final month of action, including the latter part of the regular season. With this victory, Eduardo Pérez became the first son of a Major League Baseball Hall of Famer to win a championship in a professional baseball league. After beginning the 2009–10 season with three consecutive losses, the Leones defeated the Criollos to win their first game. On November 20, 2009, the Gigantes defeated the team, scoring 17 hits. On November 25, 2009, the Indios defeated the Leones to win their fourth game of the season. In their next game, the Leones defeated Carolina. On November 28, 2009, the Leones defeated the Gigantes del Cibao in inter-league action. On November 30, 2009, Ramón Martínez began practicing with the Leones, marking his return to the league since 2001–02.

=== Liga de Béisbol Profesional Roberto Clemente (2008–present) ===
In September 2021, the LBPRC granted the franchise rights of the Leones from the 2022–23 season onwards to Ponce Sports and Entertainment, marking the team's return after a decade of inactivity.

== Caribbean Series ==
In 1972, the Leones won their first Caribbean Series championship at Santo Domingo, gathering a 5–1 record.

== Championships ==
As of 2009, the Leones won 11 LBPPR league championships, including four straight from 1942 to 1945, as follows:

1941/1942 · 1942/1943 · 1943/1944 · 1944/1945 · 1946 /1947 · 1968/1969 · 1969/1970 · 1971/1972 · 1981/1982 · 2003/2004 · 2008/2009
