= Tornados de Humacao =

Association football club based in Humacao, Puerto Rico

- Full name: Club de Fútbol Tornados de Humacao
- Founded: 1994
- Stadium: Nestor Morales Stadium; Humacao, Puerto Rico
- Chairman: (Puerto Rico) Evaristo Pérez
- Manager: (Mexico) Eloy Ubaldo Martínez Soto
- League: Puerto Rico Soccer League
- 2009: 9th
Home colors	Away colors

Tornados de Humacao is a Puerto Rican football club based in Humacao, which currently plays in the Puerto Rico Soccer League. It is affiliated to Pachuca of Mexico.

== History ==
Tornados crest when in the Liga Mayor

The team plays in Nestor Morales Stadium in Humacao.

=== Early years ===
The team's origins date back to 1994, when Colombian coach Jorge Eliécer Paredes brought together a group of boys in the neighborhood of Villa Universitaria, Humacao to practice the sport every Saturday. It wasn't until 20 April 1995 that the team officially registered in the FPF as Club de Fútbol Tornados de la Ciudad Gris, and that same year they started participating in federation sponsored youth tournaments and events. In 1996 Mexican coach Evaristo Pérez joined the team, along came the academy's first student, Jonathan Genero Grilli, a 10-year-old Argentinian boy. In 1997 they created a senior squad and joined the now defunct Liga Mayor up until its end in 2007.

In 1999, thanks to a group of concerned parents and Rosa de Trujillo the wife of the then mayor of Humacao, that wanted to consolidate the youth system, the team in all its levels has played in the Jacinto Hernández Park since 2001.

=== Puerto Rico Soccer League ===
2008 Season
On 30 June 2008, the team announced their official roster and on 5 July 2008 played their first professional game against Academia Quintana, which they lost 5–0. On its second game the team lost to Gigantes de Carolina, 5–1. On 19 July 2008, Tornados lost to Atlético de San Juan 9–0. This winless pattern continued in their fourth game, when they lost to Huracán, 2–3. On the fifth date of the tournament the team lost to Sevilla FC by ten goals, with a scores of 11–1. On 10 August 2008, Tornados lost to River Plate Puerto Rico. This marked the end of the league's first half, the teams would then compete against each other a second time. In the first two games of this stage, Tornados de Humacao lost to Guaynabo Fluminense FC and Academia Quintana. To close the regular season, the team won 1 and lost 4 games. The team's final record was 1-13-0.

2009 Season
Tornados de Humacao started the season off with an 8–1 loss to Bayamón FC. After the 8–1 loss Humacao has lost every game however all have been within 2 goals. In the last 5 games Humacao has gone 0-2-3. On 23 August 2009 the team will play Huracán to determine who is the better of the bottom two teams in the league. Humacao can win and take 8th place while Caguas can draw or win for 8th.

Puerto Rico Soccer League
Season	Position
2008–09	8th
2009–10	9th

== Club hierarchy ==
Tornados de Humacao Ltd.

Chairman: José Juan Perez Otero

Tornados de Humacao plc.

Vice President : Emilio Bezares

Club treasure : Karla Pérez

Club Secretary : Marisol Rodríguez

== Current squad ==
Note: Flags indicate national team as defined under FIFA eligibility rules; some limited exceptions apply. Players may hold more than one non-FIFA nationality.

No.	Pos.	Nation	Player
1	GK	PUR	Elimagdiel Amaro
2	MF	PUR	Luis Mojica
3	MF	PUR	Gustavo Flores
4	MF	PUR	Fernando González
5	MF	PUR	José M. Jiménez
6	MF	PUR	Hector Montes
7	DF	PUR	Israel Velázquez
8	FW	PUR	Luis Díaz
9	MF	ARG	Jonathan Genero
10	MF	PUR	José Juan Pérez
11	MF	PUR	Juan Alvarado
12	MF	PER	Manuel Obando
13	MF	PUR	Christián Hernández
14	DF	PUR	Fabián Arce

No.	Pos.	Nation	Player
15	MF	PUR	Juan Marcano
16	MF	PUR	Leonardo Rodríguez
17	DF	PUR	Michael Marcano
18	FW	PUR	Christian Ramos Acosta
19	MF	PUR	Juan Pablo Fuentes
20	DF	PUR	Isaías Oloriaga
21	GK	MEX	Juan Manuel Villamizar
22	FW	MEX	Roberto Danwing
23	DF	PER	Julian Castro
24	MF	PUR	Diego Emilio Martínez
