= Ancil Farrier =

Trinidadian footballer

Personal information
- Full name: Ancil Brandon Farrier
- Date of birth: 21 July 1986 (age 40)
- Place of birth: Los Bajos, Trinidad and Tobago
- Position: Left back

Youth career
- 2005–2008: Southern Connecticut State

International career^{‡}
Years	Team	Apps	(Gls)
2008	Trinidad and Tobago	4	(0)
- ‡ National team caps and goals as of 11:39, 17 August 2009 (UTC)

Ancil Brandon Farrier (born 21 July 1986) is a Trinidadian footballer who last played college soccer in the United States for the Southern Connecticut State University. He has also played international football for the Trinidad and Tobago, earning four caps in 2008.
