= FC Leones =

Association football team in Ponce, Puerto Rico

- Full name: Football Club Leones
- Nickname: Leones
- Founded: 2011
- Dissolved: 2011
- Stadium: Francisco Montaner Stadium; Ponce, Puerto Rico
- Capacity: 16,000
- Chairman: (Puerto Rico) José Machuca
- Manager: (Brazil) Vítor Hugo Barros
- League: Puerto Rico Soccer League
- 2011: Champions
Home colors	Away colors

FC Leones is an association football team in Ponce, Puerto Rico that plays in the Puerto Rico Soccer League. Their debut took place during the 2011 season, in which they placed second during the regular season and later, during the Playoffs Cup, became the 2011 PRSL champions. The club would quietly folded After the 2011 PRSL season.

Also classified for the CFU Clubs Championship.

== Players 2011 ==
Note: Flags indicate national team as defined under FIFA eligibility rules; some limited exceptions apply. Players may hold more than one non-FIFA nationality.

No.	Pos.	Nation	PlayerPlayer
11	FW	VIE	Tai Thanh Nguyen
—	DF	USA	Kareem Smith
—	DF	TTO	Ancil Farrier
—	MF	PUR	Raphel Ortiz Huertas
—	FW	UGA	Stanley Kaweesi
—	FW	PUR	Nelson Encarnación

No.	Pos.	Nation	Player
—	FW	BRA	Mauricio Salles (Captain)
—			Alexis Quiñónez
—		JAM	J’havone Dwayne
—			Tomás Piña
—		PER	Adrian Ferrari

== Awards ==
- 2011 Puerto Rico Soccer League First Division Regular Season - Runner Up
  - (Brazil) Mauricio Salles - (PRSL) Scorer Golden Boot
- 2011 Puerto Rico Soccer League First Division Post Season - Champions
  - (Brazil) Leo Tillemont - (PRSL) MVP Golden Ball

== Record ==
=== Year-by-year ===
Year	PRSL		CFU Club Championship	CONCACAF
Year	Playoffs	Regular Season	CFU Club Championship	CONCACAF
2011	Champions	2nd	Qualified	TBD

Puerto Rico Soccer League
Preceded by CA River Plate Puerto Rico	2011; Champion FC Leones de Ponce	Incumbent
