= Fajardo FC =

Association football club based in Fajardo, Puerto Rico

- Full name: Fajardo Futbol Club
- Founded: 2010
- Ground: Fajardo Stadium; Fajardo, Puerto Rico, Puerto Rico
- Capacity: 4,000
- Head Coach: (Peru) Henry Perales Jr.
- League: Puerto Rico Soccer League
- 2010: 4 in Group A
Home colours

Fajardo Futbol Club (Fajardo FC) is an association football team from Fajardo, Puerto Rico which competed in the Supercopa DirecTV 2010 qualifying tournament (in place of the 2010 Puerto Rico Soccer League season).

== 2010 squad ==
Note: Flags indicate national team as defined under FIFA eligibility rules; some limited exceptions apply. Players may hold more than one non-FIFA nationality.

No.	Pos.	Nation	Player
—	GK	(Puerto Rico) PUR	José A. Rosario
—		(Puerto Rico) PUR	Ryan Cooper
—		(Puerto Rico) PUR	Adam Kemelet
—		(Argentina) ARG	Víctor Hugo Salazar
—		(Peru) PER	Guillermo Chipoco
—		(Brazil) BRA	Jorge A. Araujo
—		(Puerto Rico) PUR	Omar Cintrón

No.	Pos.	Nation	Player
—		(Puerto Rico) PUR	Luis Jordán y Saunel Simonetti
—		(Puerto Rico) PUR	Daniel Mendoza
—		(Puerto Rico) PUR	Steven Fret
—		(Puerto Rico) PUR	David Mendoza
—		(Peru) PER	Piero Alca
—		(Puerto Rico) PUR	José Chávez
—		(Puerto Rico) PUR	Shaquille Santos

== See also ==
- Puerto Rico Soccer League
- Supercopa DirecTV 2010
