= 2009 Puerto Rico Soccer League season =

Puerto Rico Soccer League
- Season: 2009
- Champions: Bayamón FC
- CFU Club Championship: Bayamón FC; CA River Plate Puerto Rico; Puerto Rico Islanders FC (seeded)
- CONCACAF Champions League: Puerto Rico Islanders FC (CFU Club Championship Champion)
- Matches played: 75
- Goals scored: 238 (3.17 per match)

The 2009 Puerto Rico Soccer League Playoffs is the second year the format has been used. It is the championship of the Puerto Rico Soccer League. The format is the same as the 2008 edition with the top 4 teams from the league playing in the Tournament. The only significant change is that there will be a Home Leg and an Away Leg for the Semifinals and final. These teams play in the Semi-finals with the winner of each match going on to the Championship game.

== 2009 Puerto Rico Soccer League playoffs ==
Semi-finals
1 River Plate Ponce	1
4 Atletico de San Juan FC	2 AGG
2 Bayamon FC	3 AGG
3 Sevilla FC	2

Final
4 Atletico de San Juan FC	2
2 Bayamon FC	3 AGG

=== Champions ===
- Bayamon FC

Bayamon FC now joins River Plate Ponce as qualificants to the 2010 CFU Club Championship.

Puerto Rico Soccer League
Preceded by Sevilla FC Puerto Rico	2009; Champion; Bayamón FC; First title	Succeeded by CA River Plate Puerto Rico
