= Estadio Francisco Montaner =

Multi-use stadium in Ponce, Puerto Rico

Coordinates: 18.002422°N 66.631785°W

Estadio Francisco Montaner Francisco Montaner Stadium
- Parque Paquito Montaner
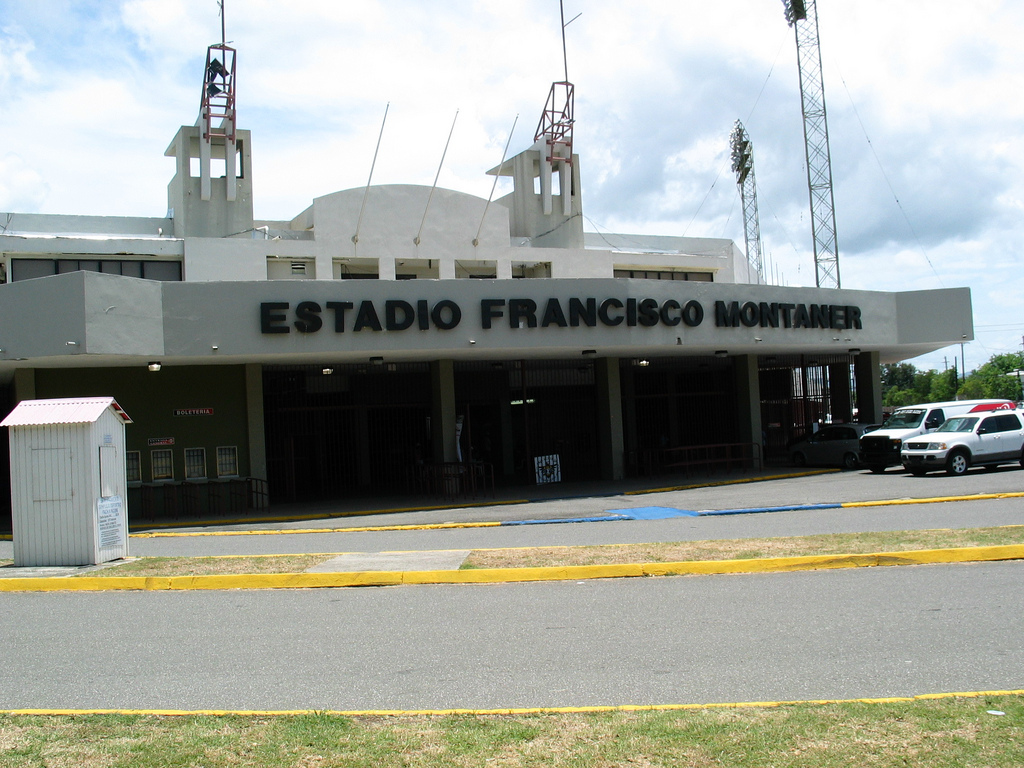
- Main entrance to the Francisco Montaner Stadium
- Interactive map of Estadio Francisco Montaner; Francisco Montaner Stadium
- Location: Ponce, Puerto Rico
- Owner: Municipality of Ponce
- Operator: Municipality of Ponce
- Capacity: Baseball-13,000 Track and Field-16,000 Soccer-15,500 Concerts-40,500
- Surface: Modular artificial turf

Construction
- Groundbreaking: 1947
- Opened: 15 October 1949

Tenants
- FC Leones (PRSL) (1949-2014); Leones de Ponce (LBPPR) (current); River Plate Ponce (former); Leones de Ponce (basketball)) (1950-1971)

The Estadio Francisco ("Paquito") Montaner (English: Francisco ("Paquito") Montaner Stadium) is a multi-use stadium in Ponce, Puerto Rico. It is home to the Leones de Ponce team of the Puerto Rico Baseball League (LBPPR) and FC Leones of the Puerto Rico Soccer League (PRSL). The stadium has a capacity of 16,000 seats. Construction of the stadium began in 1947 and it opened on 15 October 1949. Montaner is the first stadium in Puerto Rico with an artificial surface field. The stadium lies next to the Juan Pachín Vicéns Auditorium, where the Ponce Lions (basketball) hold their games. The Stadium was named to honor Francisco "Paquito" Montaner, one of the greatest Puerto Rican pitchers of all times.

== History ==
While baseball had been practiced in the city prior to this, baseball in Ponce started in earnest upon the arrival of Americans to the island after the Spanish–American War of 1898. The first non-professional baseball leagues played at Campo Atlético Charles H. Terry. After the formation of the Liga de Béisbol Semiprofesional de Puerto Rico (Puerto Rico Semiprofessional Baseball League) in 1938, the sport had matured enough that it became necessary to consider building a new stadium. This need was strengthened on 14 September 1941 when the league became professional-level. Construction of the stadium began in 1947 and it opened two years later on 15 October 1949. In addition to baseball, the stadium was also used for basketball games. These were played on a convertible basketball court that was stowed away when the basketball games were over.

== Uses ==
The PRPBL's regular playing season runs from November through January. From February to August, the venue is transformed into a track and field stadium, and also serves as a venue for other activities such as a host of the Mustang Auto Daredevils. It has also been used for intramural competitions and other academic sporting events. The track is completely covered during baseball season and then it is elevated via a hydraulic system for the track and field events.

The stadium is also used for winter training by many United States Major Baseball League players. In its early days, in particular, the stadium was used as the winter training stadium by the New York Yankees. In 1947, the game at the opening day of training was won 12 to 8 by the Leones de Ponce (Note: At the time the professional baseball team in Ponce was called Los Teloteros de Ponce (The Ponce Sluggers).) v. New York Yankees. News of the event first broke at the New York Daily News, followed by The New York Herald and The New York Times .

== Major events ==
=== Championships ===
Montaner has seen a total of 12 championships: four in BSN basketball (1952, 1961, 1964 y 1965), one in Double A (AA) baseball in 1957, six in Professional Baseball (68-69, 69-70, 71-72, 81-82, 03-04 and 08-09), and one in football in 2007.

=== Athletics ===
Montaner has also seen some great events in athletics. The Primeros Juegos Ponceños, the Frankie Colón Memorial, the Justas Intercolegiales (intercollegiate games), the Central American and Caribbean Games ("Ponce 93"), and the Iberoamerican Games, all took place here. There have also been athletics competitions at the Masters category and, more recently, the famed Ponce Grand Prix.

=== Other events ===
For many years Montaner was the venue of the finals of the Guantes Dorados de Boxeo Aficionado (Amateur Boxing's Golden Gloves), national as well as U.S.-based Professional Wrestling billboards, bull runs, concerts by internationally renowned artists, as well as the site of various major religious conventions. In February 1958, evangelist Billy Graham hosted a religious event at this stadium.

== Prominent Sportsmen at Montaner ==
=== Baseball ===
Through Montaner, Ponce has been able to see prominent figures in the world of sports such as Francisco 'Pancho' Coímbre, Felo Guilbe, Tomás 'Planchardón' Quiñones, Luis Rodríguez Olmo, 'Canena' Márquez, Carlos Bernier, José Guillermo 'Pantalones' Santiago, Luis 'Tite' Arroyo, Víctor Pellot, Roberto Clemente, Orlando 'Peruchín' Cepeda, Willie Mays, Hank Aaron, Frank Robinson, José Rafael 'Palillo' Santiago, Steve Carlton, John Boozer, Otoniel Vélez Franceschi, Roberto Alomar, Sandy Alomar Sr., José 'Cheo' Cruz, Rickey Henderson, José 'Pepe' Mangual, Luis 'Mambo' De León, Joey Cora, Juan 'Igor' González, José Vidro, Iván Rodríguez, José Molina, Raúl Casanova, Javier López, and Javier Vázquez. Various "No Hit No Run" were played in this stadium, in particular the ones by 'Pantalones' Santiago, Hank Behrman, José Luis 'Witito' Martínez, and the rare "no hitter", by Giancarlo Alvarado against the fearful Indios de Mayagüez.

=== Basketball ===
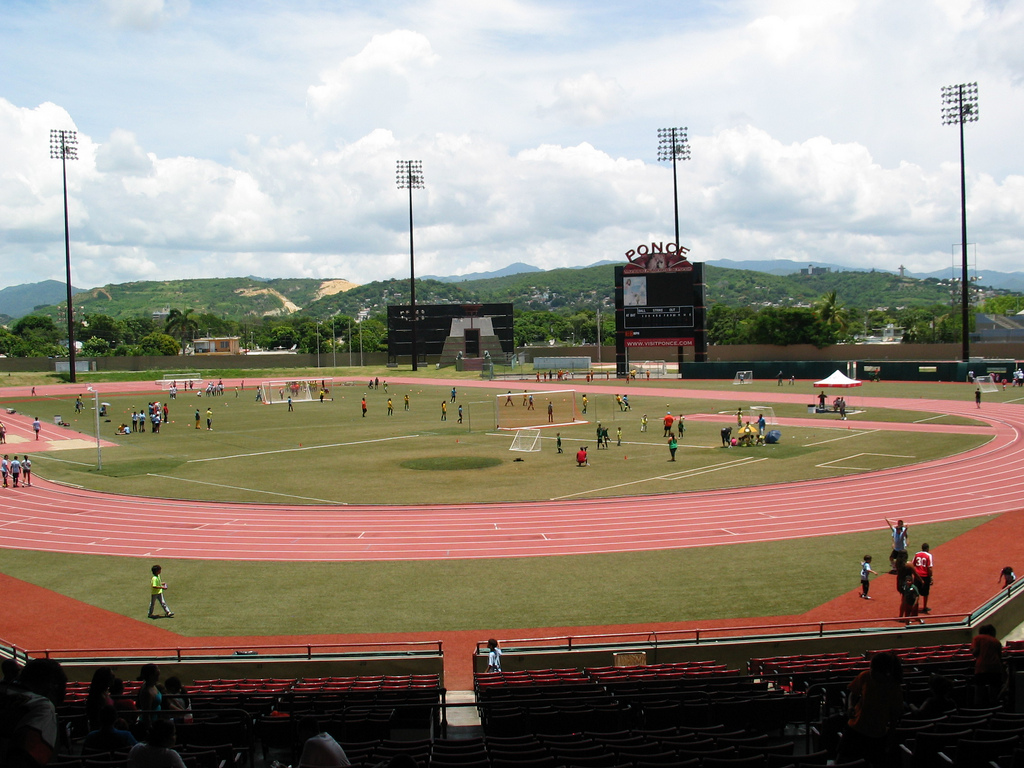
View of the Paquito Montaner Stadium from the stadium stands during a soccer event

Basketball games were also played here and since 1972 they have been played at the Juan Pachín Vicéns Auditorium). The first championship of the Leones de Ponce (baseball) in 1952. There were notable plays by Tomás 'Guabina' Gutiérrez, Antonio 'Toño' Morales, "El Barco" Salvador Dijols, Ángel 'Conejo' García, César Bocachica and Joe Hatton. Juan 'Pachín' Vicens, in particular, became the first player to reach the 5,000 points in Puerto Rican basketball.

=== Other players ===
Montaner also witnessed the speed of Juan "Papo" Franceschi, and the techniques of Arnaldo Bristol, Cuban Javier Sotomayor, Reinaldo 'Pochy' Oliver, Edgardo Guilbe, Emilio Navarro Jr., Félix Martínez, and Javier Culson.
