= Aguada Stadium =

Sports venue in Aguada, Puerto Rico

Coordinates: 18.378°N 67.197°W

Aguada Stadium Estadio de Aguada
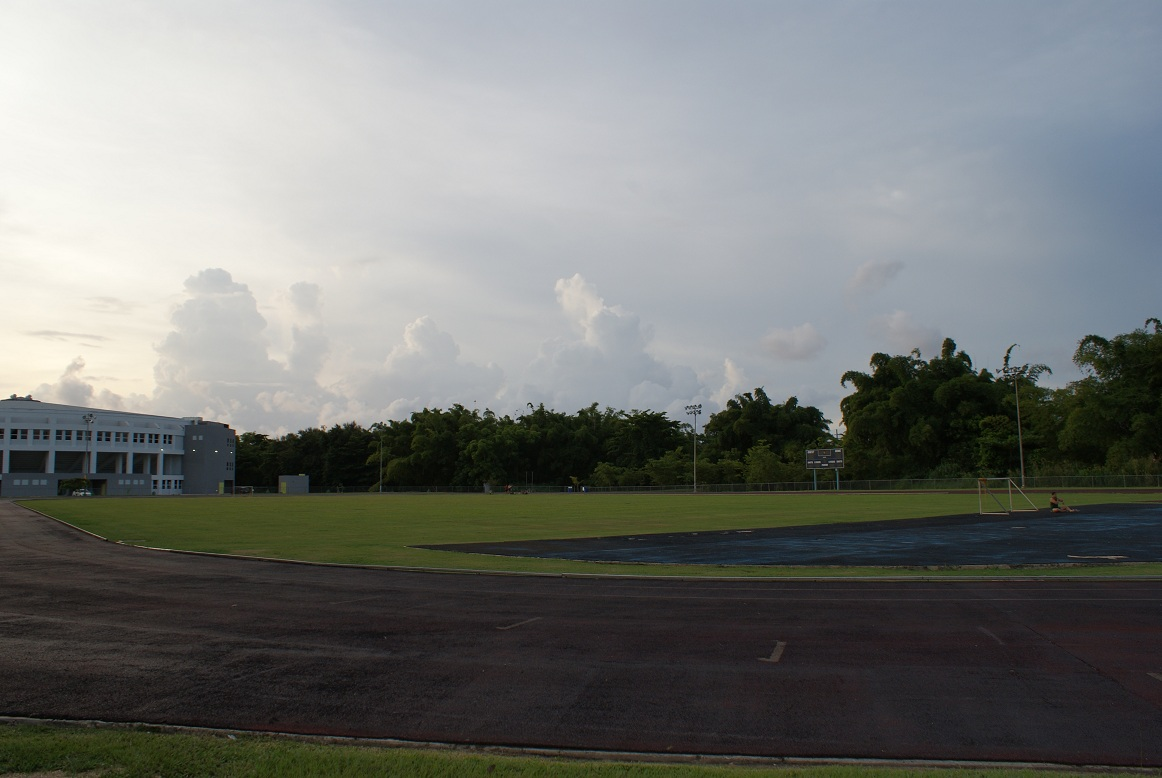
- Interactive map of Aguada Stadium; Estadio de Aguada
- Location: Aguada, Puerto Rico
- Capacity: 4,000
- Surface: Natural grass

Tenants
- Puerto Rico United (PRSL) (2011–present); Aguada Explorers (EPSL) (2018–present)

Aguada Stadium (Spanish: Estadio de Aguada) is a stadium in Aguada, Puerto Rico. It hosted some of the football events for the 2010 Central American and Caribbean Games.
