= Puerto Rico United =

Association football club based in Aguada, Puerto Rico

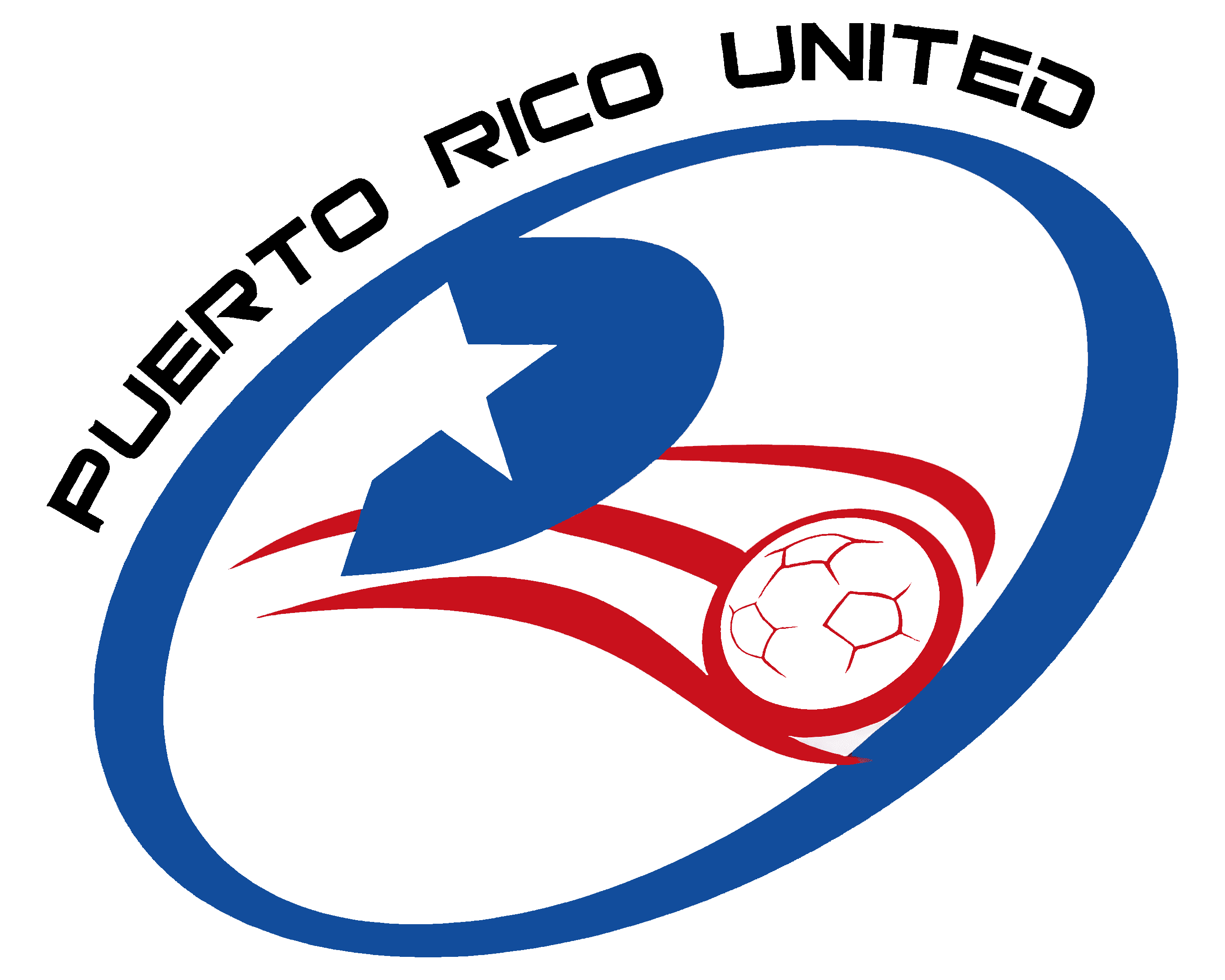
- Full name: Puerto Rico United Sporting Club
- Nickname: PR United
- Founded: 2007
- Stadium: Aguada Stadium; Aguada, Puerto Rico
- Capacity: 4,000
- Owner: Raul Blanco
- Head Coach: Jose Sanchez
- 2011 (PRSL): 4th (disqualified)
- Website: http://prunited.org/
Home colors	Away colors

Puerto Rico United was a Puerto Rican association football team based in Aguada, Puerto Rico founded in 2007. The team has played professionally in the Puerto Rico Soccer League (PRSL) and briefly in the American USL Professional Division. The team last competed in 2011.

The team's colors are lime green, silver, white and black. As of 2011, the team played its home games at Aguada Stadium.

== History ==
Puerto Rico United was founded in 2007. Beginning in 2010, they played in the Puerto Rico Soccer League (PRSL).

In 2011, they joined two other Puerto Rican clubs, River Plate Puerto Rico and Sevilla FC Puerto Rico, as well as 11 American clubs and one Antiguan club to compete in the inaugural season of the U.S.-based USL Professional Division. However, the Puerto Rican clubs quickly encountered issues due to poor attendance and high travel expenses. In May 2011, less than two months into the season, all three Puerto Rican teams were removed from the league.

The three teams then returned to play in the PRSL for the remainder of the 2011 season. The PRSL was also experiencing financial troubles, and the 2011 season included just six teams and ran from April to July. PR United finished in 4th place during regular season play, and was set to compete in the league's playoffs. However, on July 25, 2011, the PRSL suspended PR United from the tournament. According to a Puerto Rico football blog, the club was suspended for violating Puerto Rican Football Federation regulations following rumors that the club's coach lacked a work visa. Mayagüez FC, the 5th place team, took PR United's slot in the tournament.

As their financial difficulties continued, PRSL cancelled the 2012 season. In 2013, the Liga Nacional de Fútbol de Puerto Rico (LNFPR), which had previously been considered a second division league, replaced PRSL as the top active league in Puerto Rico. Puerto Rico United was set to join LNFPR in 2016. However, the league suspended operations after its 2015 season.

== Stadium ==
- Aguada Stadium, Aguada, Puerto Rico (2011–present)
- Roberto Clemente Stadium, Carolina, Puerto Rico (2011) two games

== Record ==
=== Year-by-year ===
Year	Division	League Puerto Rico Soccer League.	Regular season	Playoffs	U.S. Open Cup
2010		PRSL	3rd, Group B	did not qualify	N/A
2011	3				
