= Huracán FC de Caguas =

Association football club based in Caguas, Puerto Rico

Huracán
- Full name: Huracán Fútbol Club
- Founded: 1991
- Dissolved: 2011
- Ground: Yldefonso Sola Morales Stadium; Caguas, Puerto Rico
- Chairman: José E. Berrios
- Manager: Pedro Armstrong
- League: Puerto Rico Soccer League
- 2011: 6th
- Website: http://www.huracanfutbol.com/
Home colors	Away colors

Huracán Fútbol Club is a Puerto Rican football club from Caguas, who formerly played in the Puerto Rico Soccer League.

== History ==
The team was originally established in 1991. With the formation of the Puerto Rico Soccer League they formed a team composed of Puerto Rican and international players, including Ángel Santiago and René Bezares.

In 2010, the club was renamed from Caguas Huracán Criollos Fútbol Club to Huracán Fútbol Club

=== Puerto Rico Soccer League ===
2008 Season
During their first season in the league the team will be coached by Daniel Ramos.

Huracán debuted on July 3, 2008, in a game against Sevilla FC, losing 1–0. In its second game, the team tied with Guaynabo Fluminense FC, with neither team scoring a goal. On July 19, 2008, Huracán lost its third game against Gigantes de Carolina. On July 28, 2008, the team defeated Tornados de Humacao 3–2, gaining three points. José Delgado Santana scored the first two goals for Huracán on his team debut. On the fifth date of the tournament the team lost to River Plate Ponce. On August 10, 2008, Huracán lost to Academia Quintana. This marked the end of the league's first half, the teams would then compete against each other a second time. In the first two games of this stage, Huracán lost to Atléticos de San Juan and Sevilla FC. To close the regular season, the team won 1 and lost 4 games. in December 2008 Pedro Armstrong started as head coach of the team.

2009 Season
Huracán lost their first game 5–1 to River Plate Ponce. Huracán lost their next game with the same score 5–1 this time to Sevilla FC. On August 23, 2009 the team will play Tornados de Humacao to determine who gets 8th place, the loser is last in the table. Huracán can draw and still maintain 8th.

Puerto Rico Soccer League
Season	Position
2008–09	7th
2009–10	8th

== Club hierarchy ==
Huracán Ltd.

Chairman: Dr. José E. Berrios

Huracán plc.

Vice President : Eduardo Berrios

Club treasure : Marcos Berrios

Club Secretary : Vivian Duran

== Achievements ==
- Liga Mayor de Fútbol Nacional: 0

Runners-up (1): 2004

- Campeonato Nacional de Fútbol de Puerto Rico: 0

Runners-up (1): 2005

== Current squad ==
Note: Flags indicate national team as defined under FIFA eligibility rules; some limited exceptions apply. Players may hold more than one non-FIFA nationality.

No.	Pos.	Nation	Player
1	GK	PUR	Ricardo Romero Hernández
2	GK	PUR	Rene Bezares Mendoza
3	MF	PUR	Joshua Alexander Torres
4	DF	PUR	Gadiel Rosario Rivera
6	DF	USA	Brandon Durden
7	DF	PUR	Juan Daniel Villavicencio Várzquez
8	FW	KEN	George Sangira
9	MF	PUR	Jorge Casas Cordero
10	DF	PUR	Carlos Díaz Negron
11	MF	PUR	Ángel Ortiz Santiago
12	FW	PUR	Kenney Anaba

No.	Pos.	Nation	Player
13	MF	CUB	Julio Dairon Gonzáles Moreno
14	MF	PUR	Luis Mayoral Reichard
15	MF	PUR	Luis F. Ortiz Alicea
16	MF	PER	Paul Bazalar Vera
17	FW	PUR	Jean Villanueva Cruz
18	FW	PUR	Andrés L. Cabrera Serrano
19	FW	PUR	Antonio Miranda Echautegui
20	FW	PUR	Daniel Ramos Díaz
21	DF	PUR	Ernesto Armstrong Rosich
22	GK	PUR	Giovanni F. Ramírez Arroyo
23	FW	PUR	Christopher Mercado Crespo
