= Club Atlético River Plate Puerto Rico =

Association football club based in Fajardo, Puerto Rico

River Plate Puerto Rico
- Full name: Club Atlético River Plate Puerto Rico
- Nicknames: River Plate, River, RPPR
- Founded: 2007; 19 years ago
- Dissolved: 2011
- Stadium: Estadio Francisco Montaner
- Capacity: 11,537
- Owner: Giovanni Bonilla
- Head Coach: Walter Zermatten
- League: Puerto Rico Soccer League
Home colors	Away colors	Third colors

Club Atlético River Plate Puerto Rico was a Puerto Rican professional football team based in Ponce, Puerto Rico. Founded in 2007 as a franchise of the Argentine club River Plate, the team played in the Puerto Rico Soccer League, and are the reigning champions of the defunct Supercopa DirecTV.

The team played its home games at the Estadio Francisco Montaner in nearby Ponce. The club's colors were red, white and black. Their head coach was Argentine Walter Zermatten.

== History ==
On 27 June 2004, a group of 31 fans of C.A. River Plate of Argentina signed an affiliation document with the club. The event was led by the group's founder, Steven Alvarez. After several meetings, the group organized an in-door football team along with the team from a neighboring town Academia Quintana, finishing in the fourth place of an invitational tournament held in Bayamon which marked its debut.

In August 2004, Club Atlético River Plate Corp registered in Puerto Rico's Department of State, founding its first office in Carolina, Puerto Rico. Between 2005 and 2006, Club Atlético River Plate had several meetings with the Federación Puertorriqueña de Futbol, seeking authorization to establish the first franchise team in Puerto Rico. The federation's president, Joe Serralta, signed a contract with them agreeing to license Club Atlético River Plate Puerto Rico, which was consequently founded on 1 January 2007. The Puerto Rican franchise adopted the same shirt and badge than its Argentine counterpart.

Seeking exposition, the team reached an agreement with professional boxer Miguel Cotto, who wore the club's colors in several of his world championship contests. The team's directive underwent several integrations, including Erick Rodríguez as first vice-president, Kenneth Cintrón as second vice-president and Alvaro Nazor as vocal. In 2006, the team's secretary, Eduardo Fabrizi, decided to include Club Atlético River Plate Puerto Rico in the Liga Premier de Fútbol marking its debut. Rubén Muñoz coached a lineup that included Walter Fabian Zermatten, Leonel Pipa Ganzedo and Martin Gómez, winning its first championship before 3,000 followers. Its defender, Marcelo Roca, was selected the 2007 Premier League Most Valuable Player. While seeking for a definitive home stadium, Fabrizi visited Ponce, choosing it over the other municipalities. He subsequently had meeting with Ponce's incumbent mayor, Francisco Zayas Seijo, reaching an agreement to play there.

Some reports indicated that in 2009 the team would follow the Puerto Rico Islanders and join the USL First Division. However, River Plate's directive decided to become a founding member of the Puerto Rico Soccer League, the first nationwide league on the archipelago, which was officially founded in 2008. For its first season in the new league, River Plate brought in several international players, including footballers from Argentina, Colombia and El Salvador.

=== Puerto Rico Soccer League ===
On 28 June 2008, River Plate Puerto Rico played against Atlético de San Juan FC in the league's first official game, winning the game 2:0 with goals by Daniel Gómez and Harry Irizarry. In its second game the team lost to Sevilla FC, one goal to none. River Plate tied with Guaynabo Fluminense FC in their third outing. In their fourth game, River Plate defeated Gigantes de Carolina, three goals to one. On the fifth date of the tournament the team defeated Caguas Huracán. On 10 August 2008, River Plate defeated Tornados de Humacao. This marked the end of the league's first half, the teams would then compete against each other a second time. In the first two games of this stage, River Plate defeated Academia Quintana and Atléticos de San Juan. To close the regular season, the team won 1, lost 1 and tied 3 games.

River Plate Puerto Rico won its first game of the 2009 season against Huracán, with a score of 5:1. River Plate have yet to lose in the 2009 Season as they are 10-0-1 with 31 points. On 25 July 2009, the team tied with Bayamón FC, 0:0. They finished the regular season with a record of 14–0–2, winning the league's standing. The last game against Sevilla FC ended in a 2:2 draw. With 5 minutes left in the match and down 2:0, Daniel Jiménez scored a goal for River Plate, the team scored again 3 minutes later to finish the year undefeated. In the semifinals, River plate lost its only game of the season to Atlético.

=== Supercopa DirecTV 2010 ===
The Supercopa DirecTV is a unique CFU qualifier tournament that replaced the regular season of the PRSL in 2010. River Plate Puerto Rico was the first team to advance to the semifinals, clinching the first place of Group A. After defeating Sevilla Juncos in the Semifinals, River Plate Puerto Rico went on to win the Super Copa DirecTV after defeating the Puerto Rico Islanders on a 3–0 final score on aggregate after Home and Away games held at the Juan Ramon Loubriel stadium in Bayamon. Both teams qualified directly to the CFU Championship Tournament for the 2011 edition.

=== International performance ===
In the First Round of the 2010 CFU Club Championship River Plate was placed in the same group as Racing des Gonaives, C.S.D. Barber, and Hubentut Fortuna. In the 1st match they defeated Racing 3:1. The team defeated Hubentut Fortuna 5:1 in the second date. To close the group's first round they defeated C.S.B. Barber 4:0. River Plate finished at the top of their group and advanced to the second round along San Juan Jabloteh.

== Stadium ==
- Francisco Montaner Stadium; Ponce, Puerto Rico (2008–2010)
- Roberto Clemente Stadium; Carolina, Puerto Rico (2011–2012)

River's original home was in Ponce, and for its first three seasons the team played at Francisco Montaner Stadium. For the 2011 season the team was originally supposed to play in the city of San Juan at Estadio Sixto Escobar, but because of lack of agreement with the city of San Juan, the team agreed to move to Fajardo instead. While the city prepares to build a stadium for the team, River signed a short-term agreement to play their 2011 home games at Roberto Clemente Stadium in nearby Carolina.

== Current squad ==
Note: Flags indicate national team as defined under FIFA eligibility rules; some limited exceptions apply. Players may hold more than one non-FIFA nationality.

No.	Pos.	Nation	Player
1	GK	USA	Craig Hill
2	DF	PUR	Edwin Cano
3	DF	USA	Matías Maroni
4	MF	ARG	Jerónimo González
5	DF	ARG	Martín Morello
9	FW	CUB	Yaikel Pérez
10	MF	PUR	Petter Villegas
11	MF	ARG	Alejandro Russo
12	GK	USA	Yessid Nijim
14	DF	PUR	Nélson Torres

No.	Pos.	Nation	Player
15	MF	ARG	Gustavo Paruolo
16	MF	GUA	José Miguel Montoya
18	FW	PUR	Chris Megaloudis
19	FW	CUB	Julio Maya
21	DF	CUB	Yeniel Bermúdez
23	DF	HAI	François Frantz
24	MF	PUR	Juan Murillo
26	DF	GUA	Pedro Montoya
27	MF	PUR	Brian Bayona Becerra

== Achievements ==
- Puerto Rico Soccer League
  - Supercopa DirecTV Champion (1): 2010
  - League Champions (1): 2009
  - Runner-up (1): 2008
- Copa Monteplata
  - Winners (1): 2009
- Liga Premier
  - Winners (1): 2007

== Team records ==
=== Club Atlético Ponce 2008–2011 ===
Season	PRSL									Overall	CFU Club Championship	Top goalscorer		Managers
Season	Div.	Pos.	Pl.	W	D	L	GS	GA	P	Overall	CFU Club Championship	Name	League	Managers
2008		2nd							28	2nd	Did not enter	(Puerto Rico)		(Puerto Rico)
2009		1st							-	-	Did not enter	(Puerto Rico)		(Puerto Rico)
2010		1st	6	6	0	0	29	2	18	1st	Group Stage	(Puerto Rico)		(Puerto Rico)

=== Club Atlético Fajardo 2011–present ===
Season	USL PRO									Overall	CFU Club Championship	Top goalscorer		Managers
Season	Div.	Pos.	Pl.	W	D	L	GS	GA	P	Overall	CFU Club Championship	Name	League	Managers
2011 †											Group Stage	(Puerto Rico)		(Puerto Rico)

Season	PRSL									Overall	CFU Club Championship	Top goalscorer		Managers
Season	Div.	Pos.	Pl.	W	D	L	GS	GA	P	Overall	CFU Club Championship	Name	League	Managers
2016	Apertura	3rd	13	7	5	1	39	19	26	4th	Did not enter	(Puerto Rico)		(Puerto Rico)
2016	Clausura	10th	10	6	0	4	22	23	18	4th	Did not enter	(Puerto Rico)		(Puerto Rico)

^{†} The club was removed from USL Pro League on 10 May 2011.

Puerto Rico Soccer League
Preceded by Bayamón FC	Champion; 2010; Only title	Succeeded by FC Leones de Ponce
