= Atlético de San Juan FC =

Association football club from San Juan, Puerto Rico

Atlético de San Juan
- Full name: Club Atlético de San Juan FC
- Nickname: Los Diplomáticos
- Founded: 2008
- Ground: Hiram Bithorn Stadium; San Juan, Puerto Rico
- Capacity: 18,000
- Chairman: (Puerto Rico) Roberto Lucena
- Manager: (Brazil) Antonio Carlos Vieira
- League: Puerto Rico Soccer League
- 2009: 4th
Home colours	Away colours

Atlético de San Juan FC is a Puerto Rican association football club based in San Juan, Puerto Rico. They played in the Puerto Rico Soccer League, the island's first unified football competition. They will play their home matches at the 18,000 capacity Hiram Bithorn Stadium, which has been traditionally used for baseball.

== History ==
=== Puerto Rico Soccer League ===
2008 Season
Atlético de San Juan opened the season against Club Atletico River Plate Puerto Rico in the Hiram Bithorn Stadium, following an opening ceremony which lasted over one hour. The game was dominated by River Plate, who won 2–0. Following this defeat the team considered several adjustments, including changing the starting lineup. Atlético de San Juan won its second game against Academia Quintana, three goals to two. On July 19, 2008, the team defeated Tornados de Humacao 9–0. The team lost to Sevilla FC in their fourth game, losing one goal to nil. On the fifth date of the tournament the team tied with Guaynabo Fluminense FC, with both teams scoring four goals a piece. On August 10, 2008, Atléticos defeated Gigantes de Carolina. This marked the end of the league's first half, the teams then compete against each other a second time. In the first two games of this stage, Atléticos de San Juan defeated Caguas Huracán and lost to River Plate. To close the regular season, the team won 2, lost 2 and tied 1 game. One of these wins was against Sevilla FC, who were the last undefeated team in the tournament.

2009 Season
Atletico de San Juan started the 2009 season with a 2–0 win against Guaynabo Fluminense FC. They ended the year fourth in the league table. In the Play off finishing runner up champion. Losing in aggregate score 3–2 against Bayamon FC.

Puerto Rico Soccer League
Season	Position
2008–09	3rd
2009–10	4th

== Stadium ==
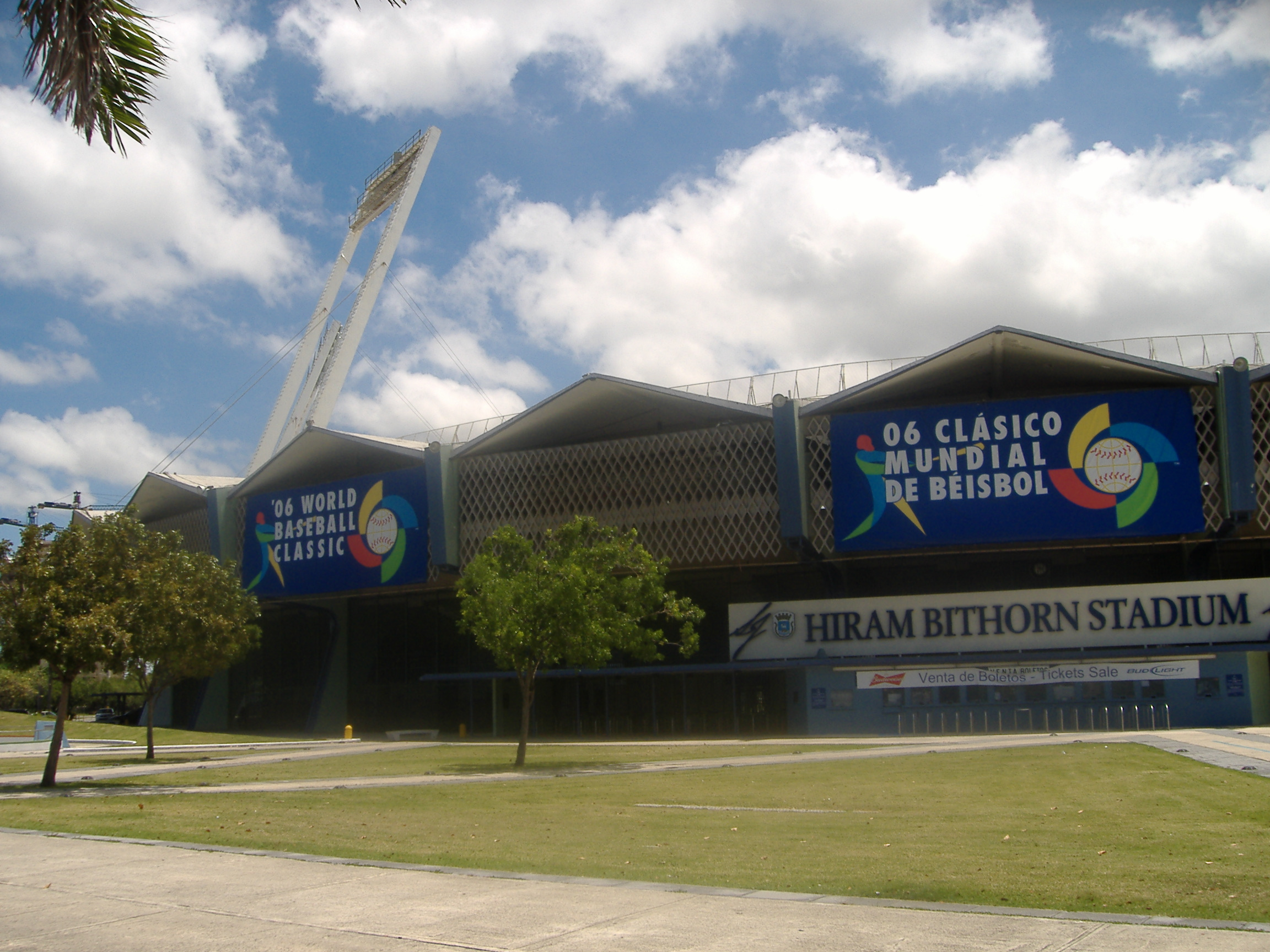
The stadium's front entrance.

They currently play in Hiran Bithorn Stadium, sharing it with Academia Quintana.

== Current squad ==
Note: Flags indicate national team as defined under FIFA eligibility rules; some limited exceptions apply. Players may hold more than one non-FIFA nationality.

No.	Pos.	Nation	Player
1	GK	USA	Nick Mele
2	DF	USA	Jon Lewandowski
3	DF	USA	Peter Dones
4	DF	CUB	Erlys García Baro
5	DF	PUR	Héctor Calderon
6	DF	BRA	Jason Carvalho Moura
7	DF	PUR	Ignacio Gual Calderon
8	DF	PUR	José Miguel Montoya
9	MF	USA	Víctor Hugo Salazar
10	MF	PER	Philip Chauca

No.	Pos.	Nation	Player
11	DF	HAI	Alfred Saintilus
12	GK	PER	Pedro Arrieta
13	MF	PUR	Alexander Cruz Núñez
14	MF	PUR	Lenin Cruz Núñez
15	MF	HON	Ricardo Alcerro
16	MF	USA	Julian Mussa
18	MF	PUR	Jason Concepción Pagán
22	FW	USA	Tyler Masterson
23	FW	PUR	Luiz Lucio Gonzaga
24	DF	TTO	Fabien Lewis

== Club hierarchy ==
Atlético de San Juan Ltd.

Chairman: Roberto Lucena

Atlético de San Juan plc.

Vice President : Ricardo Carillo

Club treasure : Antonio Martínez

Club Secretary : Carmen Carillo

== Achievements ==
- Puerto Rico Soccer League
  - Runners-up (1): 2009
