= Sevilla FC Puerto Rico =

Association football club based in Juncos, Puerto Rico

- Full name: Sevilla Fútbol Club Puerto Rico
- Nicknames: Sevilla FC, Sevilla PR, Juncos Sevilla
- Founded: 2006
- Dissolved: 2011
- Stadium: Josué Elevadito González Stadium; Juncos, Puerto Rico
- Capacity: 2,500
- Head Coach: Francis Muñoz
- League: USL Professional Division; Puerto Rico Soccer League
- 2010 (PRSL): Group Stage: 2nd, Group B Playoffs: Semi Finals
- Website: http://www.sevillafutbolclubpr.com/
Home colors	Away colors	Third colors

Sevilla FC Puerto Rico was a Puerto Rican professional association football team based in Juncos, Puerto Rico. Founded in 2006, the team used to play in the Puerto Rico Soccer League. The club was founded in 2006 as a farm team for the Puerto Rico Islanders of the North American Soccer League in Bayamón, but in 2008 partnered with the La Liga club Sevilla FC and moved a year later to Juncos. Sevilla won both the regular season and play-offs in the inaugural season of the Puerto Rico Soccer League in 2008, and also won the regular season in 2011 before losing the play-off final on penalties to Leones.

The team used to play its home games at Josué Elevadito González Stadium, and the team's colors were white, black, blue and gold. The team also had a secondary team called Atletico Sevilla that played in Liga Nacional de Futbol de Puerto Rico.

== History ==
The club was formed in 2006 as Puerto Rico Islanders B, a farm team for the United Soccer League's Puerto Rico Islanders, and played in the now defunct "Liga Premier" from 2006 to 2007. The team were based in Bayamón, outside San Juan, with their parent club. In 2008 the club found a new affiliate in the shape of Sevilla FC of La Liga, one of the leading clubs of Spain. and changed their name to Sevilla Bayamón FC. The club became one of the eight founders of the Puerto Rico Soccer League, the first nationwide league in Puerto Rico. Before the 2009 season the club folded due to ownership problems, however the city of Juncos bought them in time for the 2009 season thus allowing Sevilla FC Puerto Rico defend its title.

Sevilla FC debuted on 3 July 2008, in a 1–0 victory over Huracán, and followed the victory by beating River Plate by the same score. On 20 July 2008, Sevilla FC defeated Academia Quintana to go into first place in the league. The team solidified their position in the fourth game, where they defeated San Juan 1–0, and then defeated Tornados de Humacao 11–1. The run of five victories from the start of the season ended on 10 August 2008, when they drew against Fluminense. This marked the end of the league's first half, the teams would then compete against each other a second time. In the first two games of this stage, Sevilla FC defeated Gigantes de Carolina and Caguas Huracán. To close the regular season, the team won 3, lost 2 and drew 1 game. On 2 October 2008, Sevilla defeated the Carolina Giants 6–0 to clinch the first place of this stage. On Saturday 18 October 2008 Sevilla won the first Puerto Rico Soccer League Championship 2–1 against River Plate.

In the 2009 season, the team moved to Juncos and were renamed Sevilla-FC Juncos. Sevilla-FC Juncos won their first game of the 2009 season against Bayamón (1–0). Sevilla won their next game 5–1 against Caguas Huracan. The club ended their season in 3rd place and losing in the semifinals of the 2009 Puerto Rico Soccer League Playoffs to the eventual winners Bayamon FC. In 2011 Sevilla won the regular league championship but lost in a penalty shootout to Leones in the play-off final.

== Colors and badge ==
Up until 2007, they wore uniforms resembling that of their parent club, the Puerto Rico Islanders, using the same colors of orange, dark blue and white. In 2008, when they partnered with Sevilla FC of Spain they adopted this team's uniforms and colors of white, purple, red and black.

Their new logo

Sevilla PR's first logo

== Stadium ==
- Juan Ramon Loubriel Stadium; Bayamon, Puerto Rico (2006–2007)
- Alfredo "Papo" Alejandro Stadium; Juncos, Puerto Rico (2008–2010)
- Josué Elevadito González Stadium; Juncos, Puerto Rico (2011–present)

== Achievements ==
- Puerto Rico Soccer League
  - Play-off Champion: 2008,
  - League Champion: 2008, 2011

=== Atlético Sevilla PR ===
- Liga Premier de Fútbol de Puerto Rico:
  - Runners-up (1): 2006

== Record ==
=== Year-by-year ===
Year	Division	League	Regular season	Playoffs	Open Cup
2006		LPPR			N/A
2007		LPPR			N/A
2008		PRSL	Champions	Champions	N/A
2009		PRSL	3rd	Semi-Finals	N/A
2010		PRSL	2nd, Group B	Semi-Finals	N/A
2011	3	USL PRO			
2012		LNFPR	2nd	N/A	
2013		LNFPR	2nd	Winner	
