= Guaynabo Fluminense FC =

Association football club based in Guaynabo, Puerto Rico

- Full name: Guaynabo Fluminense Futbol Club
- Nickname(s): Flu
- Founded: 2002
- Ground: Jose "Pepito" Bonano Stadium; Guaynabo, Puerto Rico
- Chairman: (Puerto Rico) José L. Pacheco
- Manager: (Brazil) Gilberto Lopes de Figueredo
- League: Puerto Rico Soccer League
- 2009: 7th
- Website: http://www.cgflu.com/
Home colours	Away colours

Guaynabo Fluminense Futbol Club is an association football club from Guaynabo, Puerto Rico. The team was a founding member of the Puerto Rico Soccer League. The club is affiliated with Fluminense Football Club, a leading team from Brazil. The team's kit is similar to the ones used by their Brazilian counterpart.

== History ==
=== Puerto Rico Soccer League ===
2008 Season
Guaynabo Fluminense debuted on July 6, 2008, in a game against Gigantes de Carolina, which concluded with both teams tied 2-2. On its second game, the team tied again, this time against Caguas Huracán, with neither team scoring a goal. In their third outing, the team continued this pattern, tying against Club Atletico River Plate Puerto Rico. Guaynabo Fluminense FC lost to Academia Quintana in their fourth game. On the fifth date of the tournament the team tied with Atléticos de San Juan, with both teams scoring four goals a piece. On August 10, 2008, Fluminense registered its fifth draw, against Sevilla FC. This marked the end of the league's first half, the teams would then compete against each other a second time. In the first two games of this stage, Fluminense defeated Tornados de Humacao and Carolina Giants. To close the regular season, the team won 2, lost 1 and tied 2 games.

2009 Season
Guaynabo Fluminense FC started the 2009 season with a 2-0 loss to Atlético de San Juan FC. lost 4-1 to Bayamon FC.Finishing seventh in the league table and missing the play off.

Puerto Rico Soccer League
Season	Position
2008-09	4th
2009-10	7th

== Club hierarchy ==
Guaynabo Fluminense Ltd.

Chairman: José L. Pacheco

Guaynabo Fluminense plc.

Vice President : José L. Pacheco

Club treasure : Moisés Blanco

Club Secretary : Diego Montoya

== Current squad ==
Note: Flags indicate national team as defined under FIFA eligibility rules; some limited exceptions apply. Players may hold more than one non-FIFA nationality.

No.	Pos.	Nation	Player
1	GK	(United States) USA	Wesley Giachett
2	DF	(Colombia) COL	Rubén Ruelas
3	DF	(Chile) CHI	Gonzalo Irazábal
4	DF	(Haiti) HAI	Oliver Leilo-Joseph
5	MF	(Brazil) BRA	William Teles Bento
6	MF	(Colombia) COL	Daniel Gómez
7	MF	(Cuba) CUB	Erik Morales Lago
8	MF	(Puerto Rico) PUR	José A. García
9	FW	(Puerto Rico) PUR	Antonio Pacheco

No.	Pos.	Nation	Player
10	MF	(Brazil) BRA	Edivaldo da Silva
11	MF	(Puerto Rico) PUR	Edward Cruz
12	FW	(Colombia) COL	Jhonathan Sánchez
13	DF	(Brazil) BRA	Adriano Francisco de Moura
14	DF	(Puerto Rico) PUR	Roberto C. Hernández
15	FW	(Puerto Rico) PUR	Keith Pavon Montes
16	MF	(Brazil) BRA	Roberlan de Araujo
17	MF	(Puerto Rico) PUR	Juan Senorele Bevilacqua
18	GK	(Puerto Rico) PUR	Gabriel Tañón Santos
