= 2007 Caribbean Series =

2007 baseball tournament

The forty-ninth edition of the Caribbean Series (Serie del Caribe) was played held from February 2 through February 7 of 2008, featuring the champion teams from Dominican Republic (Aguilas Cibaeñas), Mexico (Naranjeros de Hermosillo), Puerto Rico (Gigantes de Carolina) and Venezuela (Tigres de Aragua). The format consisted of 12 games, each team facing the other teams twice, and the games were played at Roberto Clemente Stadium in Carolina, Puerto Rico.

== Summary ==
Dominican Republic clinched the Series with a 5-1 record and was managed by Félix Fermín, who became the first manager in series history to win three titles. In their only defeat, the Dominicans were shut out, by Puerto Rico, 1–0, on three hits. Series MVP Tony Batista led the team with three home runs and eight RBIs. Also helping out were Miguel Tejada (.304, one HR, five RBI) and Anderson Hernández (.310, six runs, two doubles). The offense led the tournament with 37 runs, while the pitching staff provided a strong support by limiting opponents to eight runs (two unearned) in 62 1/3 innings pitched for a .087 ERA. José Acevedo (1-0, six strikeouts, 0.00 ERA, 8.0 IP), Fabio Castro (1-0, four SO, 0.00, 5.0 IP), Julián Tavárez (1-0, six SO, 1.69, 5 1/3 IP), Héctor Almonte (1-0, .214, five SO, 3 2/3 IP), Julio De Paula (1-0, 0.00, three SO, 4 1/3), José Capellán (.217 ERA, five SO, 6 1/3 IP), José Vargas (one save, .267, two SO), and José Lima (0-1, 10 SO, 1.32 ERA, 13 1/3 IP) headed the staff. Also on the roster were Alberto Castillo, Bernie Castro, Nelson Cruz, Pablo Ozuna and Luis Polonia. Overall, the Dominican Republic won the Series for the 16th time, one more than Puerto Rico. This was the fifth time that the Águilas Cibaeñas (Cibao Eagles) represented the Dominicans and took the title.

The Puerto Rican team, managed by Lino Rivera, finished second with a 4-2 mark. The offense was clearly guided by Armando Ríos, who led the Series hitters in batting average (.545), hits (12), stolen bases (2), SLG (.682), OBS (.667) and OPS (1.349). Other contributions came from Juan González (.385, three runs, two RBI), Javier Valentín (.368) and Alex Cora (.364, two doubles, two runs, four RBI). Other than starters Giancarlo Alvarado (1-0, 0.73, 10 SO, 12 1/3 IP) and Brian Edwards (1-0, 4.50, 6.0 IP), the pitching rotation proved ineffective. Relievers Pedro Feliciano (2-0, 0.00, 5.0 IP, four SO), Bubbie Buzachero (1.80, one save, five SO, five IP) and Fernando Cabrera (0.00 ERA, 0.00 OBA, two SO, three IP) provided some support. Other players in the roster included Hiram Bocachica, Rubén Gotay, Luis Matos, José Santiago, and the brothers José and Yadier Molina.

Venezuela was guided by Buddy Bailey and finished 2-4 in third place. The two victories came at the expense of Mexico and Puerto Rico. The offense was guided by Oscar Salazar, who led the series batters with nine RBI, while hitting .346 (9-for-26) with two home runs and a .654 SLG. Two other hitters carried much of the offensive weight: José Castillo (.321, six doubles, four runs, three RBI) and Ronny Cedeño (.440, 11 hits, .481 OBP). Despite a 2.18 collective ERA, the pitching staff was victim of a lousy defense that committed 11 errors. Starters Josmir Romero (1-0, 0.00), Tim McClaskey (1-0, 3.60, five SO, five IP) and Horacio Estrada (0-0, 2.25, 12 IP) each turned in fine efforts, while Yohan Pino (0.00, 10 SO, 7 1/3 IP) and Kevin Tolar (0.00, five SO, 3 1/3 IP) did the job out of the bullpen. The Venezuelan team also featured players such as Cory Bailey, Alex Delgado, Ramón Hernández, Luis Rodríguez, Randall Simon and Steve Torrealba.

Piloted by Lorenzo Bundy, Mexico was outscored by their opponents 45-13 and finished in last place with a 1-5 record, getting its only victory against Venezuela. A one-man offensive performance was led by Luis Alfonso García, who finished second in the batting race with a .458 average (11-for-24) and hit four doubles with four RBI; Juan Cañizalez batted .333 (6-for-18), Alfredo Amézaga hit the team's only home run, and Pablo Ortega was the only pitcher to lose two games in the Series that year. The team also included veterans such as Vinny Castilla, Elmer Dessens, Erubiel Durazo, Karim García, Gerónimo Gil and Derrick White.

== Final standings ==
Country	Club	W	L	W/L %	GB	Managers
Dominican Republic	Aguilas Cibaeñas	5	1	.833	–	Félix Fermín
Puerto Rico	Gigantes de Carolina	4	2	.667	1.0	Lino Rivera
Venezuela	Tigres de Aragua	2	4	.333	3.0	Buddy Bailey
Mexico	Naranjeros de Hermosillo	1	5	.167	4.0	Lorenzo Bundy

Individual leaders
Player/Club	Statistic
Armando Ríos/PUR	Batting average	.545
Tony Batista/DOM	Home runs	3
Oscar Salazar/VEN	Runs batted in	11
Anderson Hernández/DOM; Miguel Tejada/DOM	Runs	6
Armando Ríos/PUR	Hits	12
José Castillo/VEN	Doubles	6
Gregor Blanco/VEN; José Fernández/DOM; Luis Polonia/DOM; Armando Ríos/PUR; Oscar Salazar/VEN	Triples	1
José Fernández/DOM; Armando Ríos/PUR	Stolen bases	2
Pedro Feliciano/PUR	Wins	2
Giancarlo Alvarado/PUR; José Lima/DOM; Yohan Pino/VEN	Strikeouts	10
Giancarlo Alvarado/PUR	Earned run average	0.73
José Lima/DOM	Innings pitched	13 1/3
Jorge Sosa/DOM	Saves	2
Kevin Tolar/VEN	Games pitched	4
Awards
Tony Batista/DOM	Most Valuable Player
Félix Fermín/DOM	Manager

All-Star Team
Name/Club	Position
Alberto Castillo/DOM	catcher
Javier Valentín/PUR	first baseman
Anderson Hernández/PUR	second baseman
Tony Batista/DOM	third baseman
Miguel Tejada/DOM	shortstop
Oscar Salazar/VEN	left fielder
Alex Fernández/DOM	center fielder
Armando Ríos/PUR	right fielder
Juan González/PUR	designated hitter
José Acevedo/DOM	right-handed pitcher
Fabio Castro/DOM	left-handed pitcher
Félix Fermín/DOM	manager

=== Scoreboards ===
==== Game 1, February 2 ====
Team	1	2	3	4	5	6	7	8	9	10	11	12	13	14	15	16	17	18	R	H	E
Venezuela	0	0	0	1	0	1	0	0	0	0	0	0	0	0	0	0	0	1	3	15	4
Dominican Republic	0	0	0	1	0	1	0	0	0	0	0	0	0	0	0	0	0	2	4	9	2
WP: Héctor Almonte (1-0) LP: Francisco Butto (0-1); Home runs: VEN: None; DOM: Miguel Tejada (1), Tony Batista (1)

==== Game 2, February 2 ====
Team	1	2	3	4	5	6	7	8	9	R	H	E
Mexico	0	0	0	1	0	0	0	0	0	1	4	1
Puerto Rico	0	2	0	4	3	0	2	0	x	11	16	0
WP: Giancarlo Alvarado (1-0) LP: Elmer Dessens (0-1); Home runs: MEX: Alfredo Amézaga (1); PRI: Víctor Rodríguez (1)

==== Game 3, February 3 ====
Team	1	2	3	4	5	6	7	8	9	R	H	E
Dominican Republic	0	0	4	0	3	2	0	0	0	9	14	0
Mexico	0	0	0	0	3	0	0	0	0	0	5	0
WP: José Acevedo (1-0) LP: Pablo Ortega (0-1); Home runs: DOM: Tony Batista 2 (3), Nelson Cruz (1); MEX: None

==== Game 4, February 3 ====
Team	1	2	3	4	5	6	7	8	9	R	H	E
Puerto Rico	0	0	0	2	0	0	3	0	1	6	13	0
Venezuela	0	1	1	0	0	0	1	0	0	3	8	2
WP: Brian Edwards (1-0) LP: Rosman García (0-1) Sv: Bubbie Buzachero (1); Home runs: PRI: None; VEN: Gregor Blanco (1)

==== Game 5, February 4 ====
Team	1	2	3	4	5	6	7	8	9	R	H	E
Mexico	0	0	0	1	1	1	0	0	0	3	10	2
Venezuela	7	0	0	0	1	5	0	0	x	13	17	1
WP: Tim McClaskey (1-0) LP: Justin Lehr (0-1); Home runs: MEX: None; VEN: Oscar Salazar (1)

==== Game 6, February 4 ====
Team	1	2	3	4	5	6	7	8	9	R	H	E
Puerto Rico	0	0	0	0	0	0	0	0	0	0	3	1
Dominican Republic	4	2	0	3	0	0	3	0	x	12	14	1
WP: Fabián Castro (1-0) LP: Jonathan Albadalejo (0-1)

==== Game 7, February 5 ====
Team	1	2	3	4	5	6	7	8	9	R	H	E
Dominican Republic	0	2	0	0	0	0	2	3	0	7	11	0
Venezuela	0	0	0	0	1	0	0	0	0	1	6	2
WP: Julián Tavárez (1-0) LP: Vladimir Núñez (0-1)

==== Game 8, February 5 ====
Team	1	2	3	4	5	6	7	8	9	10	R	H	E
Puerto Rico	0	0	0	2	0	0	0	0	0	2	4	10	0
Mexico	1	0	1	0	0	0	0	0	0	0	2	9	3
WP: Pedro Feliciano (1-0) LP: Luther Hackman (0-1)

==== Game 9, February 6 ====
Team	1	2	3	4	5	6	7	8	9	R	H	E
Mexico	0	1	0	0	0	1	0	1	0	3	6	0
Dominican Republic	1	0	1	0	0	0	2	1	x	5	9	1
WP: Julio De Paula (1-0) LP: Pablo Ortega (0-2) Sv: José Vargas (1); Home runs: MEX: None; DOM: José Fernández (1)

==== Game 10, February 6 ====
Team	1	2	3	4	5	6	7	8	9	R	H	E
Venezuela	0	0	0	0	0	1	1	0	1	3	8	1
Puerto Rico	0	0	0	0	0	0	0	1	0	1	11	1
WP: Josmir Romero (1-0) LP: Willie Collazo (0-1) Sv: Francisco Butto (1); Home runs: VEN: Oscar Salazar (2); PRI: None

==== Game 11, February 7 ====
Team	1	2	3	4	5	6	7	8	9	R	H	E
Venezuela	0	0	0	0	1	0	1	1	0	3	11	1
Mexico	0	0	0	1	0	0	1	1	1	4	7	0
WP: Mauricio Tequida (1-0) LP: Juan Ovalles (0-1)

==== Game 12, February 7 ====
Team	1	2	3	4	5	6	7	8	9	R	H	E
Dominican Republic	0	0	0	0	0	0	0	0	0	0	3	1
Puerto Rico	0	0	0	0	0	0	0	0	1	1	5	0
WP: Pedro Feliciano (1-0) LP: José Lima (0-1)

== See also ==
- Ballplayers who have played in the Series

== Sources ==
- Antero Núñez, José. Series del Caribe. Jefferson, Caracas, Venezuela: Impresos Urbina, C.A., 1987.
- Gutiérrez, Daniel. Enciclopedia del Béisbol en Venezuela – 1895–2006 . Caracas, Venezuela: Impresión Arte, C.A., 2007.
