= 2010 Caribbean Series =

2010 baseball tournament

The fifty-second edition of the Caribbean Series (Serie del Caribe) was played in 2010. It was held from February 2 through February 7 with the champions teams from Dominican Republic (Leones del Escogido), Mexico (Naranjeros de Hermosillo), Puerto Rico (Indios de Mayagüez) and Venezuela (Leones del Caracas). The format consisted of 12 games, in a double round-robin format with each team facing each other twice. The games were played at Estadio Nueva Esparta in Porlamar, Margarita Island, Venezuela.

== Final standings ==
Country
Club
W
L
W/L %
GB
Managers
Dominican Republic
Leones del Escogido
5
1
.833
–
Ken Oberkfell
Puerto Rico
Indios de Mayagüez
4
2
.667
1

Mako Oliveras

Mexico
Naranjeros de Hermosillo
2
4
.333
3
Homar Rojas
Venezuela
Leones del Caracas
1
5
.167
4
Dave Hudgens

== Individual leaders ==
Player	Statistic
Jesús Feliciano (PUR)	Batting average	.481
Kevin Barker (DOM); Fernando Martínez (DOM)	Home runs	2
Juan Francisco (DOM)	RBI	6
Ramón Santiago (DOM)	Runs	6
Jesús Feliciano (PUR)	Hits	13
Juan Francisco (DOM); Armando Ríos (PUR); Chris Roberson (MEX); Ramón Santiago (DOM); Danny Valencia (PUR)	Doubles	2
Miguel Abreu (PUR); Rubén Rivera (MEX)	Triples	1
Freddy Guzmán (DOM)	Stolen bases	5
Kevin Barker (DOM)	OBP	.567
Kevin Barker (DOM)	SLG	.800
Kevin Barker (DOM)	OPS	1.657
Raúl Valdés (DOM)	Wins	2
Raúl Valdés (DOM)	Strikeouts	13
Pete Parise (PUR); Orlando Román (PUR)	ERA	0.00
Mario Santiago (PUR)	Innings pitched	12.0
Darío Veras (DOM)	Saves	3
Darwin Cubillán (VEN); Gabriel García (VEN); Edgar Huerta (MEX)	Games pitched	4

== All-Star Team ==
Name	Position
Edwards Guzmán (PUR)	catcher
Kevin Barker (DOM)	first baseman
Pablo Ozuna (DOM)	second baseman
Vinny Castilla (MEX)	third baseman
Ángel Sánchez (PUR)	shortstop
Fernando Martínez (DOM)	left fielder
Jesús Feliciano (PUR)	center fielder
Armando Ríos (PUR)	right fielder
Raúl Padrón (VEN)	designated hitter
Nelson Figueroa (DOM)	RH starting pitcher
Raúl Valdés (DOM)	LH starting pitcher
Pete Parise (PUR)	RH relief pitcher
Efrain Nieves (PUR)	LH relief pitcher
Awards
Fernando Martínez (DOM)	Most Valuable Player
Mako Oliveras (PUR)	Manager

== Scoreboards ==
=== Game 1, February 2 ===
Team	1	2	3	4	5	6	7	8	9	R	H	E
Puerto Rico	0	0	0	0	0	1	0	0	0	1	7	2
Dominican Republic	1	0	0	0	0	1	0	0	x	2	4	2
WP: R. Valdés (1-0) LP: M. Santiago (0-1) Sv: D. Veras (1); Home runs: PUR: None; DOM: K. Barker (1); Boxscore

=== Game 2, February 2 ===
Team	1	2	3	4	5	6	7	8	9	R	H	E
Mexico	2	0	0	4	0	0	1	0	0	7	9	1
Venezuela	0	0	0	1	0	1	0	0	0	2	7	2
WP: P. Ortega (1-0) LP: G. Moscoso (0-1); Home runs: MEX: V. Castilla (1); VEN: None; Boxscore

=== Game 3, February 3 ===
Team	1	2	3	4	5	6	7	8	9	R	H	E
Dominican Republic	4	2	0	0	0	1	0	0	0	7	10	0
Mexico	0	0	0	0	0	0	0	1	0	1	3	0
WP: N. Figueroa (1-0) LP: H. Rodríguez (0-1); Home runs: DOM: F. Martínez (1); MEX: C. Valencia (1); Boxscore

=== Game 4, February 3 ===
Team	1	2	3	4	5	6	7	8	9	R	H	E
Venezuela	0	2	2	1	0	0	0	0	0	5	11	2
Puerto Rico	0	0	0	2	0	0	0	0	0	2	11	2
WP: E. Estanga (1-0) LP: J. Padilla (0-1) Sv: O. Moreno (1); Home runs: VEN: R. Padrón (1); PUR: R. Ruiz (1); Boxscore

=== Game 5, February 4 ===
Team	1	2	3	4	5	6	7	8	9	R	H	E
Mexico	0	0	0	2	0	0	0	0	1	3	8	0
Puerto Rico	3	0	0	0	0	2	0	0	x	5	12	4
WP: B. Pulsipher (1-0) LP: T. Blackley (0-1) Sv: S. Rivera (1); Home runs: MEX: None; PUR: M. Hernandez (1); Boxscore

=== Game 6, February 4 ===
Team	1	2	3	4	5	6	7	8	9	R	H	E
Venezuela	0	2	0	0	0	0	0	0	0	2	6	0
Dominican Republic	0	0	0	0	0	1	2	0	x	3	5	4
WP: J. Veras (1-0) LP: D. Cubillán (0-1) Sv: D. Veras (2); Home runs: VEN: O. Salazar (1); DOM: None; Boxscore

=== Game 7, February 5 ===
Team	1	2	3	4	5	6	7	8	9	R	H	E
Dominican Republic	0	0	1	0	1	0	0	1	0	3	8	1
Puerto Rico	3	0	0	0	0	3	1	0	x	7	11	2
WP: O. Román (1-0) LP: F. Díaz (0-1); Boxscore

=== Game 8, February 5 ===
Team	1	2	3	4	5	6	7	8	9	10	R	H	E
Venezuela	0	1	1	0	0	0	0	0	0	0	2	8	1
Mexico	0	0	0	1	0	1	0	0	0	1	3	10	0
WP: M. Mendoza (1-0) LP: E. Serrano (0-1); Home runs: VEN: M. Ryan (1); MEX: K. García (1); Boxscore

=== Game 9, February 6 ===
Team	1	2	3	4	5	6	7	8	9	R	H	E
Mexico	2	0	0	0	0	0	0	0	0	2	4	1
Dominican Republic	2	0	1	1	2	0	1	0	x	7	10	1
WP: H. Phillips (1-0) LP: W. Silva (0-1); Home runs: MEX: L. García (1); DOM: K. Barker (2), F. Martínez (2), J. Francisco (1); Boxscore

=== Game 10, February 6 ===
Team	1	2	3	4	5	6	7	8	9	R	H	E
Puerto Rico	0	0	1	0	3	3	0	0	0	7	11	0
Venezuela	0	0	0	0	1	0	0	0	0	1	4	2
WP: E. Nieves (1-0) LP: H. Totten (0-1); Home runs: PUR: D. Valencia (1), J. Feliciano (1); VEN: None; Boxscore

=== Game 11, February 7 ===
Team	1	2	3	4	5	6	7	8	9	R	H	E
Puerto Rico	0	3	0	0	2	3	0	0	0	8	13	1
Mexico	0	0	0	2	0	0	0	0	0	2	8	1
WP: M. Santiago (1-1) LP: P. Ortega (1-1); Home runs: PUR: None; MEX: L. Cruz (1); Boxscore

=== Game 12, February 7 ===
Team	1	2	3	4	5	6	7	8	9	R	H	E
Dominican Republic	4	0	0	0	2	0	1	0	0	7	10	1
Venezuela	0	0	0	1	3	0	0	0	0	4	3	5
WP: R. Valdés (2-0) LP: R. Ramírez (0-1) Sv: D. Veras (3); Home runs: PUR: None; VEN: C. Quintero (1); Boxscore

- Note: Darío Veras earned his series career 7th save to set an all-time record.

== Sources ==
- Minor League Baseball.com
- ESPN.com
