= 1972 Caribbean Series =

1972 baseball tournament

The fifteenth edition of the Caribbean Series (Serie del Caribe) was played in 1972. It was held from February 1 through February 6 with the champions teams from Dominican Republic (Aguilas Cibaeñas), Mexico (Algodoneros de Guasave), Puerto Rico (Leones de Ponce) and Venezuela (Tigres de Aragua). The format consisted of 12 games, each team facing the other teams twice. The games were played at Estadio Quisqueya in Santo Domingo, D.R., which boosted capacity to 14.000 seats, and the first pitch was thrown by Joaquín Balaguer, by then the President of Dominican Republic.

== Summary ==
Puerto Rico won the Series with a 5-1 record and was managed by Frank Verdi. The Leones de Ponce was in the middle of the pack in runs scored (33), prevailing their strong pitching. The club got a fine offensive performances from 1B and Series Most Valuable Player Carlos May, who won the batting title with a .455 batting average (10-for-22), while three of the four series home runs were belted by outfielders Don Baylor (grand slam), Tommy Cruz and Rusty Torres. The pitching staff posted a collective 1.67 ERA, including two shutouts by Gary Neibauer (one-hit) and Daryl Patterson, and received fine efforts from Gary Jones (2-0, 0.81 ERA, 11.0 innings pitched), and Jim Magnuson (1-0, 1.00 ERA). Other significant players in the roster included Sandy Alomar Sr. (2B), Bernie Carbo (OF), Pat Corrales (C), José Cruz (OF), Jackie Hernández (SS), José Ortiz (OF), Santiago Rosario (PH) and Chris Zachary (P).

Dominican Republic and Venezuela finished tied for second place with a 3-3 mark.

The Dominican's Aguilas Cibaeñas squad was piloted by Ozzie Virgil Sr. Other than Secundino Almonte (five-hit shutout), Gene Garber (1-1, 2.57 ERA) and Ed Acosta (1-0, 4.97), the pitching staff was inconsistent at times. Two hitters carried much of the offensive weight, RF César Cedeño (.348 BA) and LF Adrian Garrett (one home run, four RBI). The team also featured Ps Charlie Hough, Juan Jiménez and Ray Newman; C Charlie Sands; IFs Julián Javier, Winston Llenas, Ted Martínez and Frank Taveras, and OFs César Cedeño, Gene Clines and Sam Mejías.

The Venezuelan Tigres de Aragua debuted in the tournament, being guided by manager/second baseman Rod Carew (.400 BA, .500 SLG); C Faustino Zabala (.333 BA, .476 SLG) and SS Dave Concepción (.348 BA, /435 SLG). The pitching support came from starters Alan Closter (2-0, 3.38 ERA, nine strikeouts in 13 1/3 IP) Earl Stephenson (1-0, 0/0.00 ERA, 13 strikeouts in 10 2/3 IP) and Milt Wilcox (1-1, 1.76 ERA, 14 SO), and closer Roberto Muñoz (0-1, three saves in five games). The Venezuelan club also featured players as Ps Aurelio Monteagudo and Pablo Torrealba; IFs Brant Alyea, César Gutiérrez and Luis Salazar, and OFs Ted Ford, Pat Kelly and César Tovar.

Mexico was represented by the Algodoneros de Guasave and finished last at 1-5. The hapless Mexicans were piloted by Vinicio (Chico) García, as the team scored the fewest runs (12) and set a series record for most consecutive shutouts (2). Thor Skogan did an excellent job, pitching a five-hit shutout in Game 2 and losing a 1-0 decision in Game 9, after allowing just one hit and one unearned run. 3B Celerino Sánchez (.333) and OF Ramón Montoya (.312) led the attack for an otherwise weak offense. Were also included in the roster Héctor Espino (IF), Al Hrabosky (P), Sergio Robles (C) and Aurelio Rodríguez (IF)

Final standings
Country	Club	W	L	W/L %	GB
Puerto Rico	Leones de Ponce	5	1	.833	–
Dominican Republic	Aguilas Cibaeñas	3	3	.500	2.0
Venezuela	Tigres de Aragua	3	3	.500	2.0
Mexico	Algodoneros de Guasave	1	5	.167	4.0

Individual leaders
Player	Statistic
Carlos May (PRI)	Batting average	.455
Don Baylor (PRI); Tommy Cruz (PRI); Adrian Garrett (DOM); Rusty Torres (PRI)	Home runs	1
Don Baylor (PRI)	RBI	6
Jackie Hernández (PRI)	Runs	7
Carlos May (PRI)	Hits	10
Brant Alyea (VEN); Ted Ford (VEN); Pat Kelly (VEN)	Doubles	2
Sandy Alomar Sr. (PRI); Rod Carew (VEN); David Concepción (VEN); Faustino Zabala (VEN)	Triples	1
Seven tied	Stolen bases	1
Alan Closter (VEN); Gary Jones (PRI)	Wins	2
Alan Closter (VEN)	Strikeouts	16
Thor Skogan (MEX)	ERA	0.00
Thor Skogan (MEX)	Innings pitched	18.0
Roberto Muñoz (VEN)	Saves	3
Roberto Muñoz (VEN)	Games pitched	5
Awards
Carlos May (PRI)	Most Valuable Player
Frank Verdi (PRI)	Manager

All-Star Team
Name	Position
Faustino Zabala (VEN)	catcher
Carlos May (PRI)	first baseman
Rod Carew (VEN)	second baseman
Celerino Sánchez (MEX)	third baseman
David Concepción (VEN)	shortstop
Don Baylor (PRI)	left fielder
Ramón Montoya (MEX)	center fielder
César Cedeño (DOM)	right fielder
Thor Skogan (MEX)	starting pitcher
Roberto Muñoz (VEN)	relief pitcher
Frank Verdi (PRI)	manager

== Scoreboards ==
=== Game 1, February 1 ===
Team	1	2	3	4	5	6	7	8	9	R	H	E
Puerto Rico	0	0	0	0	0	2	1	0	1	4	7	2
Venezuela	0	0	1	0	0	2	0	0	0	3	8	2
WP: Gary Jones (1-0) LP: Milt Wilcox (0-1) Sv: Gary Neibauer (1)

=== Game 2, February 1 ===
Team	1	2	3	4	5	6	7	8	9	R	H	E
Dominican Republic	0	0	0	0	0	0	0	0	0	0	5	2
Mexico	0	0	2	0	3	0	2	3	X	10	13	4
WP: Thor Skogan (1-0) LP: Gene Garber (0-1)

=== Game 3, February 2 ===
Team	1	2	3	4	5	6	7	8	9	R	H	E
Mexico	0	0	0	0	0	0	0	0	0	0	8	4
Puerto Rico	1	0	0	1	4	1	1	0	X	8	12	0
WP: Daryl Patterson (1-0) LP: Félipe Leal (0-1)

=== Game 4, February 2 ===
Team	1	2	3	4	5	6	7	8	9	R	H	E
Venezuela	0	0	2	0	0	2	2	0	0	6	10	1
Dominican Republic	0	0	0	0	0	0	0	0	0	4	6	0
WP: Alan Closter (1-0) LP: Charlie Hough (0-1) Sv: Roberto Muñoz (1)

=== Game 5, February 3 ===
Team	1	2	3	4	5	6	7	8	9	R	H	E
Venezuela	0	0	0	0	0	1	0	0	0	1	9	1
Mexico	0	0	0	0	0	0	0	0	0	0	4	1
WP: Earl Stephenson (1-0) LP: Al Hrabosky (0-1) Sv: Roberto Muñoz (2)

=== Game 6, February 3 ===
Team	1	2	3	4	5	6	7	8	9	R	H	E
Dominican Republic	0	0	0	0	0	0	0	0	1	1	7	2
Puerto Rico	0	0	0	0	1	0	0	0	1	2	6	0
WP: Gary Jones (2-0) LP: Charlie Hough (0-2); Home runs: DOM: None; PRI: Rusty Torres (1)

=== Game 7, February 4 ===
Team	1	2	3	4	5	6	7	8	9	R	H	E
Venezuela	0	0	1	0	0	0	0	0	0	1	7	2
Puerto Rico	0	3	0	4	3	0	0	3	X	13	14	3
WP: Jim Magnuson (1-0) LP: Pablo Torrealba (0-1); Home runs: VEN: None; PRI: Don Baylor (1), Tommy Cruz (1)

=== Game 8, February 4 ===
Team	1	2	3	4	5	6	7	8	9	R	H	E
Mexico	0	0	0	0	0	0	0	0	0	0	5	1
Dominican Republic	0	0	0	0	0	2	1	0	X	3	10	0
WP: Secundino Almonte (1-0) LP: Mike Baldwin (0-1); Home runs: MEX: None; DOM: Adrian Garrett (1)

=== Game 9, February 5 ===
Team	1	2	3	4	5	6	7	8	9	R	H	E
Puerto Rico	0	0	0	0	0	1	0	0	0	1	4	0
Mexico	0	0	0	0	0	0	0	0	0	0	1	1
WP: Gary Neibauer (1-0) LP: Thor Skogan (1-1)

=== Game 10, February 5 ===
Team	1	2	3	4	5	6	7	8	9	R	H	E
Dominican Republic	0	0	0	1	0	0	0	0	1	2	7	1
Venezuela	0	0	1	0	0	0	0	0	0	1	8	1
WP: Gene Garber (1-1) LP: Milt Wilcox (0-1)

=== Game 11, February 6 ===
Team	1	2	3	4	5	6	7	8	9	R	H	E
Mexico	0	1	1	0	0	0	0	0	0	2	8	0
Venezuela	0	1	0	1	0	0	0	2	X	4	12	0
WP: Alan Closter (2-0) LP: Raúl Gómez (0-1) Sv: Roberto Muñoz (3)

=== Game 12, February 6 ===
Team	1	2	3	4	5	6	7	8	9	R	H	E
Puerto Rico	0	1	1	0	1	0	0	2	0	5	9	1
Dominican Republic	0	1	1	0	0	2	2	0	X	6	10	2
WP: Ed Acosta (1-0) LP: Raúl Mercado (0-1) Sv: Charlie Hough (1)

== See also ==
- Ballplayers who have appeared in the Series

== Sources ==
- Antero Núñez, José. Series del Caribe. Impresos Urbina, Caracas, Venezuela.
- Araujo Bojórquez, Alfonso. Series del Caribe: Narraciones y estadísticas, 1949-2001. Colegio de Bachilleres del Estado de Sinaloa, Mexico.
- Figueredo, Jorge S. Cuban Baseball: A Statistical History, 1878 - 1961. Macfarland & Co., United States.
- González Echevarría, Roberto. The Pride of Havana. Oxford University Express.
- Gutiérrez, Daniel. Enciclopedia del Béisbol en Venezuela, Caracas, Venezuela.
