= Earl Stephenson =

American baseball player (born 1947)

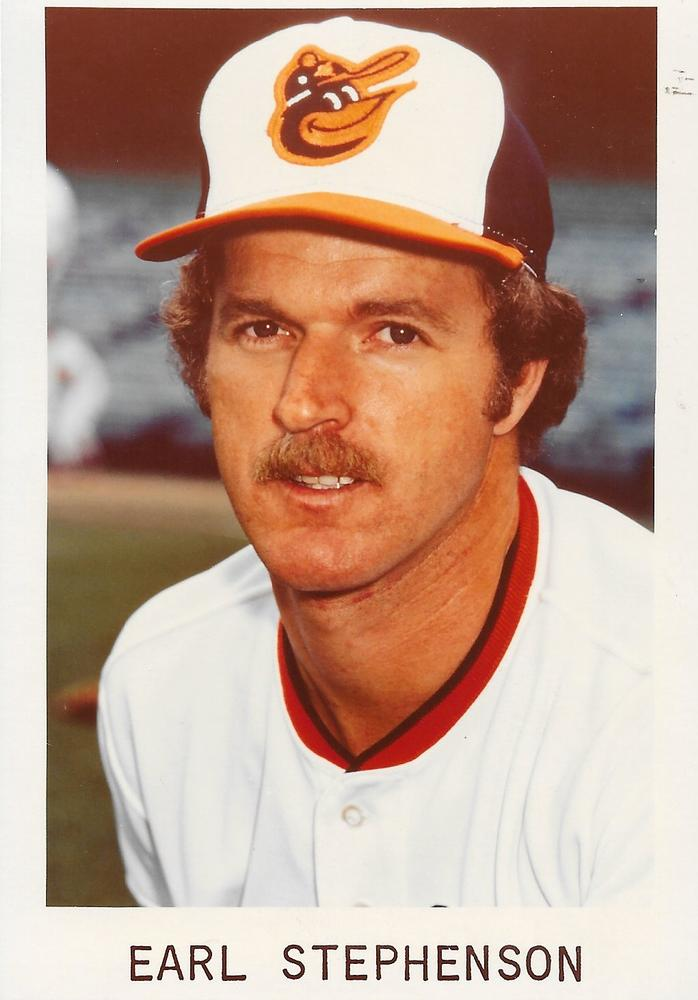
- Pitcher
- Born: July 31, 1947 (age 78); Benson, North Carolina, U.S.
- Batted: Left Threw: Left

MLB debut
- April 7, 1971, for the Chicago Cubs

Last MLB appearance
- July 26, 1978, for the Baltimore Orioles

MLB statistics
- Win–loss record: 4–5
- Earned run average: 3.57
- Strikeouts: 50
- Stats at Baseball Reference

Teams
- Chicago Cubs (1971); Milwaukee Brewers (1972); Baltimore Orioles (1977–1978)

Chester Earl Stephenson (born July 31, 1947) is an American former Major League Baseball pitcher. The left-hander was drafted by the Chicago Cubs in the 3rd round of the 1967 amateur draft and played for the Cubs (1971), Milwaukee Brewers (1972), and Baltimore Orioles (1977–1978).

== Career ==
Born in Benson, North Carolina, Stephenson made his major league debut in relief on April 7, 1971 against the St. Louis Cardinals. He pitched a scoreless sixth and seventh in a 14–3 loss at Wrigley Field. He earned his first and only save seventeen days later against the New York Mets, hurling 2.1 scoreless innings in a 7–5 home victory.

He got his first big league win on May 16, 1971. In the first game of a home doubleheader vs. the San Diego Padres Stephenson entered the 7–7 contest in the top of the 10th and gave up a run, but the Cubs bailed him out with two runs in the bottom of the inning, thanks to a 2-run walk-off homer by Jim Hickman.

Stephenson was traded along with Jim Colborn and Brock Davis by the Cubs to the Milwaukee Brewers for outfielder José Cardenal on December 3, 1971. His best year in the majors was 1972 when he spent the entire season with the Brewers. He got into 35 games, most in relief, and was 3–5 with a 3.25 earned run average. In his other three big league years he spent the majority of the seasons in the minor leagues.

One highlight of the '72 season occurred at County Stadium when he earned his first win as a starting pitcher, hurling seven scoreless innings in a 2–0 victory over the Boston Red Sox in game one of a June 25 doubleheader. Another great start for Stephenson, even though he lost, was ten days later at Anaheim Stadium. His pitching opponent was future Hall of Famer Nolan Ryan of the California Angels. They were locked in a 0–0 game for eight innings, but the Angels scored a run with two out in the bottom of the 9th for a 1–0 win. (walk-off single by Winston Llenas)

Stephenson was dealt along with Jim Lonborg, Ken Brett and Ken Sanders by the Brewers to the Philadelphia Phillies for Don Money, John Vukovich and Bill Champion on October 31, 1972. He was selected by the Montreal Expos from the Eugene Emeralds in the Rule 5 draft on December 3, 1973.

Career totals for 54 games pitched include a 4–5 record, 8 games started, 1 complete game, 13 games finished, and 1 save. He allowed 45 earned runs in 113.1 innings pitched for an ERA of 3.57, struck out 50, and walked 49. Stephenson was a good defensive pitcher but a poor hitter. He handled 24 out of 25 chances successfully for a fielding percentage of .960, but went 0-for-20 (.000) at the plate with 13 strikeouts.

In between, Stephenson played winter ball with the Tigres de Aragua and Navegantes de Magallanes clubs of the Venezuelan League in three seasons spanning 1971–1977, pitching also for Aragua in the 1972 Caribbean Series. Afterwards, he played for the Bradenton Explorers of the United States Senior Professional Baseball Association in 1989.

== Facts ==
- Even though he pitched just 80.1 innings in 1972, Stephenson tied for tenth among American League hurlers with seven wild pitches. By contrast, it took the other seven pitchers who were tied with him for tenth an average of 177.2 innings to throw the same number of wild pitches.
- He led the Pacific Coast League with 53 pitching appearances in 1973 while playing for the Eugene Emeralds.
