= 2013 World Baseball Classic championship =

Baseball game, held in San Francisco

2013 World Baseball Classic Final
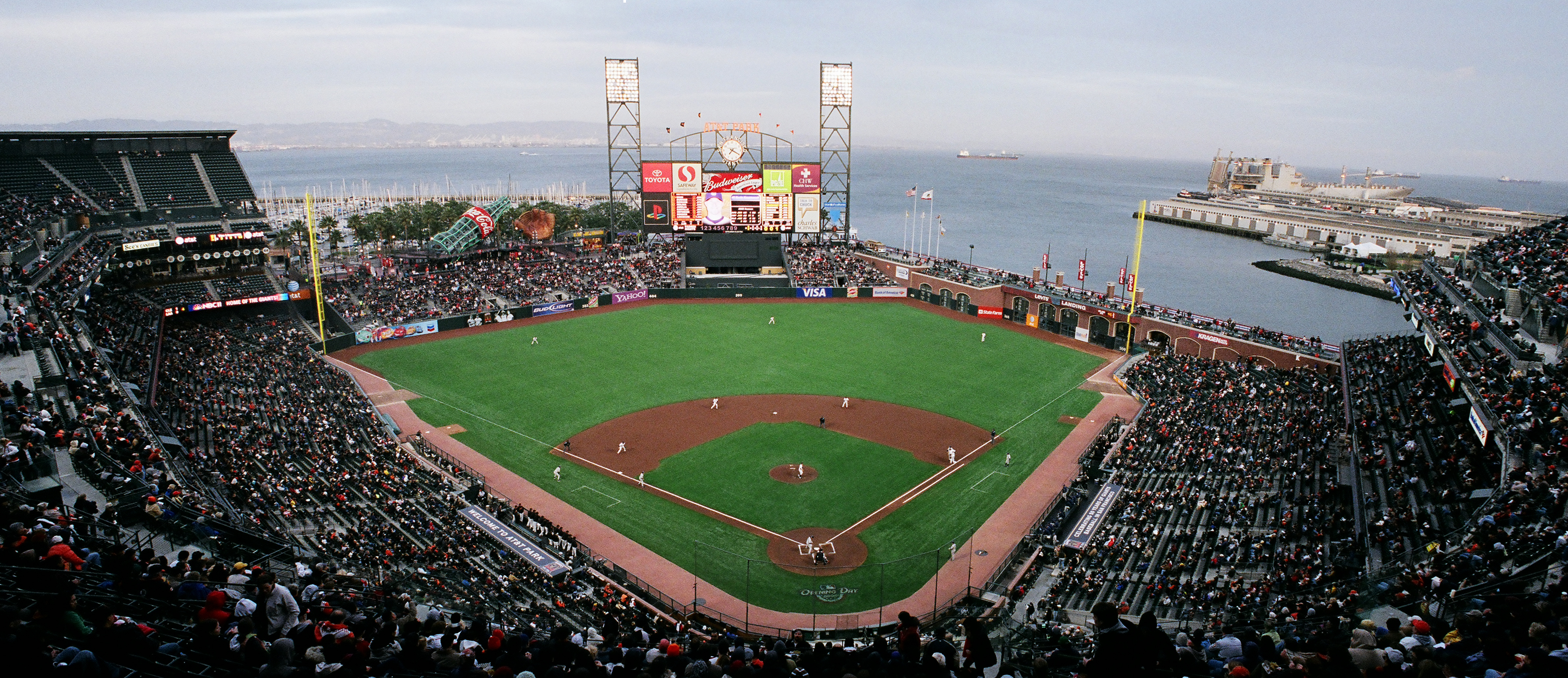
- Oracle Park, San Francisco
Puerto Rico	Dominican Republic
(Puerto Rico)	(Dominican Republic)
0	3
	1	2	3	4	5	6	7	8	9	R	H	E
Puerto Rico	0	0	0	0	0	0	0	0	0	0	3	0
Dominican Republic	2	0	0	0	1	0	0	0	X	3	8	1
- Date: March 19, 2013
- Venue: Oracle Park
- City: San Francisco, California, U.S.
- Managers: Edwin Rodríguez (Puerto Rico); Tony Peña (Dominican Republic)
- Umpires: HP: (United States) Ted Barrett; 1B: (Australia) Paul Hyham; 2B: (United States) Bill Miller; 3B: (Panama) Edgar Estivision; LF: (United States) Wally Bell; RF: (Canada) Trevor Grieve
- MVP: Robinson Canó (Dominican Republic)
- Attendance: 35,703
- Time of game: 5:30 p.m. PDT
- Television: Multiple
- Radio: Multiple

The championship round of the 2013 World Baseball Classic was held at AT&T Park in San Francisco, California, United States, from March 17 to 19, 2013.

The championship round was decided in two semi final games and a final game. In the final (championship) game, the team with the higher winning percentage of games in the tournament were to be the home team. If the teams competing in the final had identical winning percentages in the tournament, then World Baseball Classic, Inc. (WBCI) would conduct a coin flip or draw to determine the home team.

The Dominican Republic defeated the Netherlands and Puerto Rico to win their first World Baseball Classic championship. Robinson Canó was named the tournament's Most Valuable Player.

== Bracket ==
Semifinals
2R	Puerto Rico	3
1W	Japan	1
1R	Netherlands	1
2W	Dominican Republic	4

Final
SF1W	Puerto Rico	0
SF2W	Dominican Republic	3

Note: "1R" = runner up in Pool 1.

== Results ==
- All times are Pacific Daylight Time (UTC−07:00).

=== Semifinal 1 − Puerto Rico 3, Japan 1 ===
March 17 18:00 at AT&T Park
Team	1	2	3	4	5	6	7	8	9	R	H	E
Puerto Rico	1	0	0	0	0	0	2	0	0	3	9	0
Japan	0	0	0	0	0	0	0	1	0	1	6	1
WP: Mario Santiago (1–1) LP: Kenta Maeda (2–1) Sv: Fernando Cabrera (3); Home runs: PUR: Alex Ríos (1); JPN: None; Attendance: 33,683 (80.4%); Umpires: HP − Bill Miller, 1B − Edgar Estivision, 2B − Wally Bell, 3B − Trevor Grieve, LF − Ted Barrett, RF − Paul Hyham; Boxscore

Two time World Baseball Classic defending champions Japan faces off against surprising upstart Puerto Rico in the first semi-final matchup. Puerto Rico scores a run from the first inning and scored two additional runs from a home run by Alex Ríos as the Japanese team struggle to catch up. Japan, however, only managed to score at least a run; Seiichi Uchikawa made a baserun snafu in an effort to steal second but was caught up between first and second bases as catcher Yadier Molina tags Uchikawa for a second out. Despite the efforts, Japan eventually loses to Puerto Rico 3-1 as their championship streak from two previous World Baseball Classic games has ended and the Japanese team gracefully bows out to the stands and the Puerto Rican baseball team after their defeat.

=== Semifinal 2 − Dominican Republic 4, Netherlands 1 ===
March 18 18:00 at AT&T Park
Team	1	2	3	4	5	6	7	8	9	R	H	E
Netherlands	1	0	0	0	0	0	0	0	0	1	4	1
Dominican Republic	0	0	0	0	4	0	0	0	X	4	9	0
WP: Edinson Vólquez (1–0) LP: Diego Markwell (2–1) Sv: Fernando Rodney (6); Attendance: 27,527 (65.7%); Umpires: HP − Wally Bell, 1B − Trevor Grieve, 2B − Ted Barrett, 3B − Paul Hyham, LF − Bill Miller, RF − Edgar Estivision; Boxscore

=== Final − Dominican Republic 3, Puerto Rico 0 ===
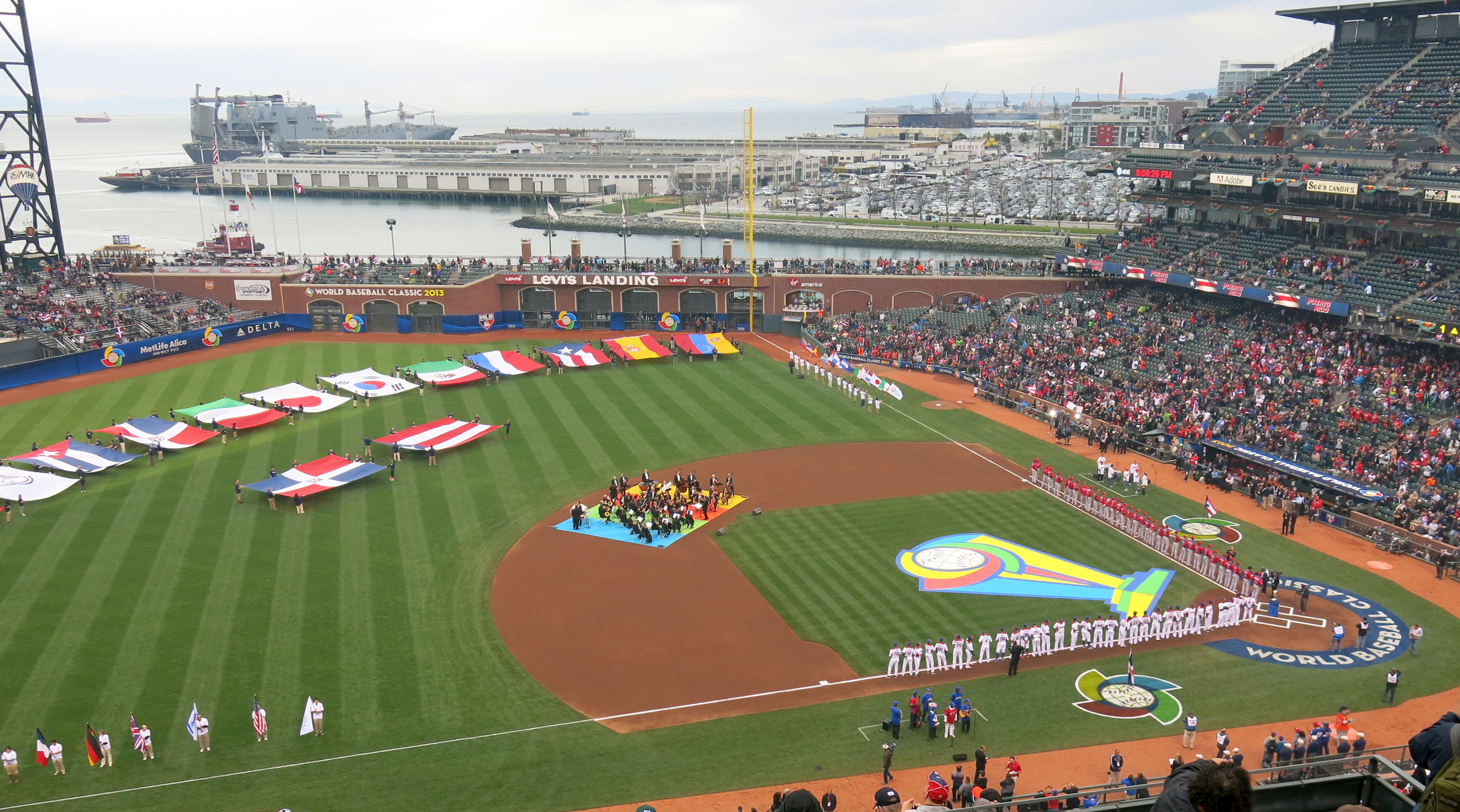
Flags from countries participating in the 2013 World Baseball Classic are shown in a pre-game ceremony on the Championship Game at AT&T Park in San Francisco, CA, USA, on March 19, 2013.

March 19 17:00 at AT&T Park
Team	1	2	3	4	5	6	7	8	9	R	H	E
Puerto Rico	0	0	0	0	0	0	0	0	0	0	3	0
Dominican Republic	2	0	0	0	1	0	0	0	X	3	8	1
WP: Samuel Deduno (2–0) LP: Giancarlo Alvarado (1–1) Sv: Fernando Rodney (7); Attendance: 35,703 (85.2%); Umpires: HP − Ted Barrett, 1B − Paul Hyham, 2B − Bill Miller, 3B − Edgar Estivision, LF − Wally Bell, RF − Trevor Grieve; Boxscore

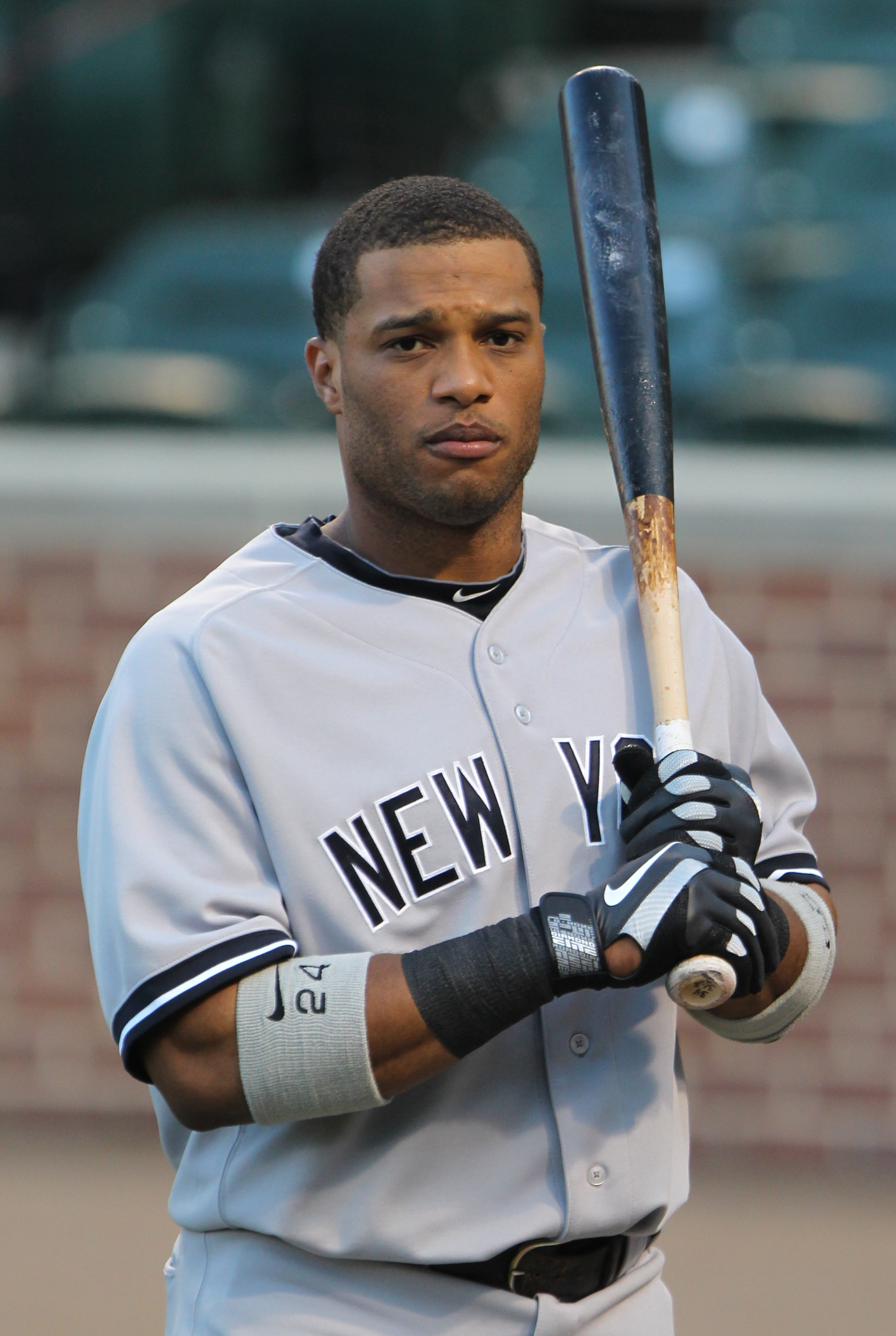
Robinson Canó, the tournament's Most Valuable Player

In the final, Samuel Deduno started for the Dominican Republic, while Giancarlo Alvarado started for Puerto Rico. 35,703 fans attended the game at AT&T Park in San Francisco. An additional 50,000 Dominican fans watched the game at Estadio Quisqueya in Santo Domingo, Dominican Republic. In Puerto Rico, the final was the most watched sporting event for the past year with nearly three-fourths of all households tuning in.

Edwin Encarnación hit a two-run double in the first inning, giving the Dominican Republic the lead. Erick Aybar had the game's third run batted in for the Dominican Republic. Deduno recorded five strikeouts in five scoreless innings pitched and Fernando Rodney completed the game with a save, his seventh save of the tournament. Four Dominican relief pitchers combined for 4 scoreless innings.

This was the third time in the tournament that the Dominican Republic defeated Puerto Rico. The Dominican Republic completed the tournament with an 8–0 record, becoming the first undefeated team to win the World Baseball Classic. Robinson Canó was named the Most Valuable Player of the Classic after he batted 15-for-32 (.469), the most hits in tournament history. After the match the team was congratulated immediately for their victory by Dominican president Danilo Medina.
