= Pablo Ortega (baseball) =

Mexican baseball player (born 1976)

- Pitcher
- Born: November 7, 1976 (age 49); Nuevo Laredo, Tamaulipas, Mexico
- Bats: Switch Throws: Right
- Stats at Baseball Reference

Career highlights and awards
- Mexican League Rookie of the Year (2000)
Medals
Men's baseball
Representing Mexico
Pan American Games
Bronze medal – third place	2003 Santo Domingo	Team
Bronze medal – third place	2007 Rio de Janeiro	Team
Central American and Caribbean Games
Bronze medal – third place	2006 Cartagena	National team

Pablo Javier Ortega Salinas (born November 7, 1976) is a Mexican former professional baseball pitcher. He played in the Mexican League, minor league baseball and Mexico national baseball team.

== Career ==
Ortega debuted in 1995 with his hometown Nuevo Laredo Tecolotes, going 0–1 with a 5.93 ERA in five games at age 18. Signed by the Tampa Bay Devil Rays before the organization had a major league team, he was one of their top farm players in 1996. He went 4–6 with a 1.97 ERA for the Gulf Coast Devil Rays and struck out 86 in 82 innings while allowing only 61 hits and 12 walks. He was 6th in the Gulf Coast League in ERA and led in innings pitched. He was second to Jeriome Robertson in strikeouts. Baseball America rated him as the #5 Devil Rays prospect.

In 1996, the right-hander went 12–10 with a 2.86 ERA for the 60-82 Charleston RiverDogs, allowing only 30 walks in 189 innings while striking out 142. He led Devil Rays farmhands in innings pitched and ERA. He paced the South Atlantic League in innings and starts (29) and was 8th in the SAL in ERA. Ortega struggled in 1998 with the St. Petersburg Devil Rays, going 5–9 with a 4.40 ERA and allowing 187 hits in 155 innings.

Pablo led Tampa Bay farmhands in 1999 with 13 losses, splitting time between St. Petersburg (1-2, 1.93), the Orlando Rays (8-10, 3.87) and the Durham Bulls (0-1, 34.71 in one atrocious start). In the winter of 1999–2000, Ortega was with the Venados de Mazatlán and was 4–6 with a 3.08 ERA, battling rare control problems (44 BB in 76 IP).

Ortega's control did not return in 2000 with the Tigres Capitalinos but he still was 11–3 with a 4.34 ERA. He was MVP of the finals as he went 2–0 with a 0.93 ERA. In 2001, he fell to 5–9, 5.21 with the Tigres. He had a great winter in 2001–2002, going 4–5 with 2 saves and a 2.40 ERA for Mazatlán. He was 9th in the Mexican Pacific League in ERA.

Ortega had another rough summer in 2002, with a 3–7, 6.94 record between Mexico City and the Puebla Parrots. The next year was a vast improvement as he went 13–4 with a 3.14 ERA for the Angelopolis Tigers. His accuracy was back as he walked 46 in 161 innings of work. He was named Pitcher of the Year and the Tigers had the best record in the regular season.

He was nearly unbeatable for the 2003–2004 Venados de Mazatlán, going 9–1 with a 2.40 ERA. He was one win behind Mexican Pacific League leader Francisco Campos and was 7th in ERA. Moving to the Monterrey Sultans that summer, he had a 6–2, 3.36 record.

Ortega led Mazatlán in 2004–2005, now going 9–3 with a 2.88 ERA, one win behind LMPB leader Jorge Campillo. Ortega was 5th in the league in ERA. Mazatlán made it to the 2005 Caribbean Series and pulled off a title. Ortega helped, going 1–0 with a 1.13 ERA to team with Campos and Campillo for a fine trio on the hill.

In the regular season, Ortega was 8–5 with a 4.45 ERA for the Tigers. The winter of 2005–2006 was semisweet – his record was 4-5 but his 2.49 ERA was second only to Spike Lundberg. Mazatlán went 35-32 even though their top two hurlers, Ortega and Campos, combined to go 8–11. In the 2006 Caribbean Series, he allowed two runs in nine innings in a no-decision against Puerto Rico.

Ortega was a strong performer in the 2006 World Baseball Classic, striking out five in four scoreless innings for Mexico. The Angelopolis hurler had a wretched 2006 Mexican League season, with a 5–6, 6.27 record and allowing 121 hits in 95 innings. He still was put on the Mexican squad for the 2006 COPABE Olympic Qualifier and was their top hurler. He went 2–0 with a 0.54 ERA. In 16 2/3 IP, Ortega struck out 22 while allowing only 10 hits and 2 walks. He was third in the tournament in ERA behind Frank Montieth and Norberto González. He was one win behind leader Rafael Díaz and was one strikeout behind Adiel Palma. In the 2006 Central American and Caribbean Games, Pablo had a 0.79 ERA in 3 games for Mexico, which won Bronze.

The right-hander had a 7–6, 3.29 record for the 2006–2007 Venados, finishing 6th in the LMP in ERA. He was smacked around in the 2007 Caribbean Series, going 0–2 with a 12.79 ERA, twice losing to the champion Águilas Cibaeñas. In the 2007 Pan American Games, Ortega allowed five baserunners but only one run in 2 2/3 IP, striking out three in two relief stints.

With the Tigres de Quintana Roo in 2007, Ortega posted a mark of 12–3, 2.38 with only 91 hits and 28 walks in 113 1/3 innings. He lost Pitcher of the Year honors to Nerio Rodríguez. He went 5–4 with a 2.86 ERA for Mazaltan in 2007–2008, walking 20 and allowing 75 hits in 94 1/3 innings.

In the 2008 Final Olympic Qualification Tournament, the 31-year-old was 1–1 with a 3.18 ERA. He took the loss against Taiwan but then shut down Germany to win a pitching duel with Enorbel Márquez.

Ortega went 11–5 with a 3.05 ERA for the 2008 Tigres, with 28 walks in 121 innings. He was 10th in the league in ERA and tied for fifth in wins. He topped 100 career wins. In the 2008 Americas Baseball Cup, Pablo went 2–0 with a 0.84 ERA, again finishing 10th in ERA, while tying for 8th in wins. He led the event with 3 wild pitches.

For Mazatlán in the 2009 Caribbean Series, he started a win over the Ponce Lions but got a no-decision; he allowed one run in 6 1/3 IP despite nine hits and three walks. Ortega allowed 5 runs in 4 2/3 IP in the 2009 World Baseball Classic. He lasted just two innings in his only start, against Cuba. For the summer of 2009, Pablo was 13–5 with a 3.19 ERA for Quintana Roo. He tied Roberto Ramírez for second in the Mexican League in wins, behind Andres Meza. He was also 7th in ERA.

Ortega was 1–1 with a 4.00 ERA in the 2010 Caribbean Series, doing well in a win over the Leones del Caracas but struggling in a loss to the Indios de Mayagüez. He had a rough summer at 2–6, 8.24 in 2010. He started 2011 back in form (10-3, 3.29) with the Tigres de Quintana Roo. On July 24, 2011, he threw a no-hitter against the Rojos del Águila de Veracruz, keeping a perfect game until he issued a walk with one out in the 9th.
