= Mario Santiago (baseball) =

Puerto Rican baseball player (born 1984)

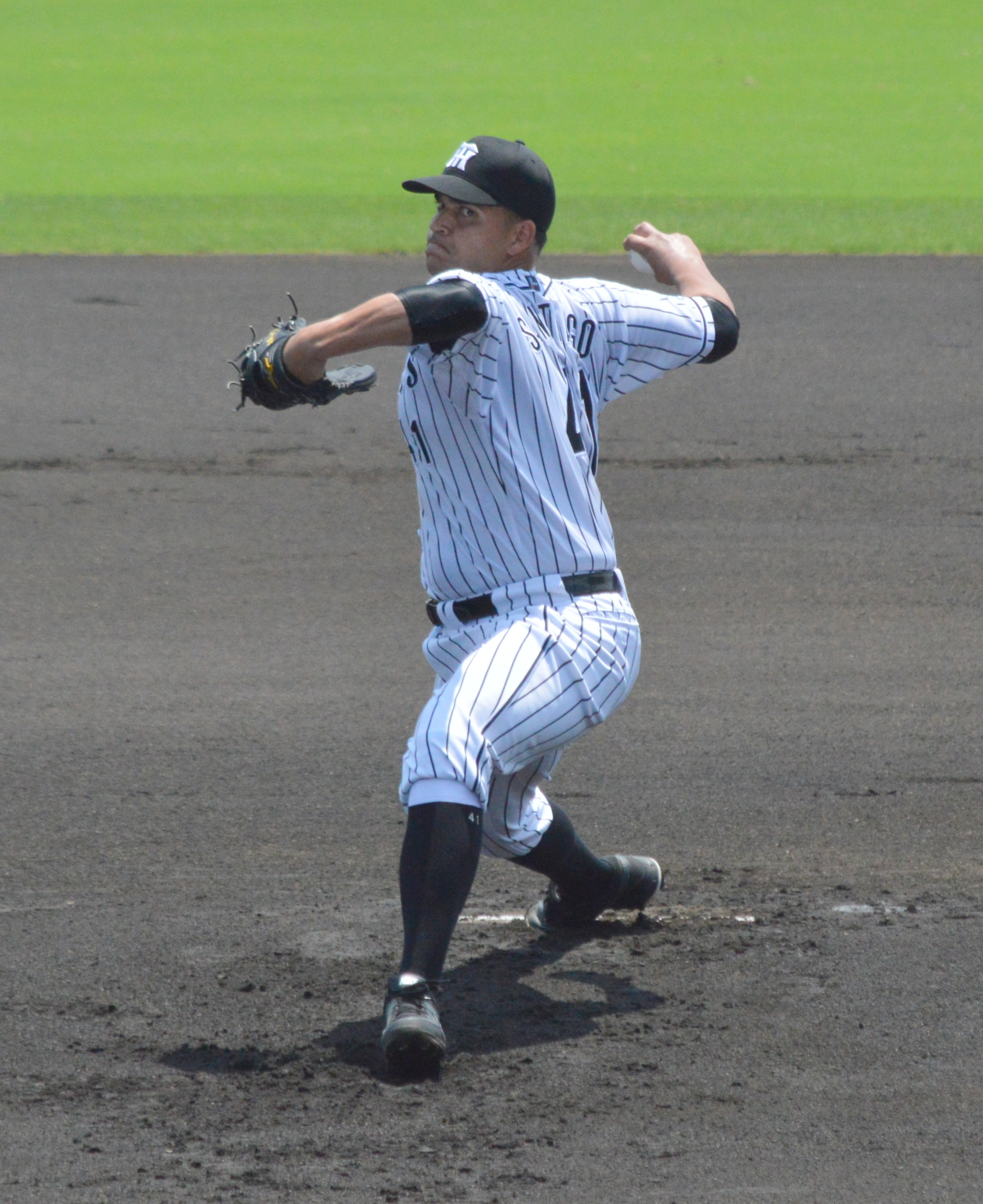
- Santiago with the Hanshin Tigers
- Starting pitcher
- Born: December 16, 1984 (age 41); Guayama, Puerto Rico
- Batted: Right Threw: Right

Professional debut
- KBO: April 7, 2012, for the SK Wyverns
- NPB: May 15, 2015, for the Hanshin Tigers

Last appearance
- KBO: 2012, for the SK Wyverns
- NPB: May 28, 2015, for the Hanshin Tigers

KBO statistics
- Win–loss record: 6–3
- Earned run average: 3.40
- Strikeouts: 49

NPB statistics
- Win–loss record: 1–0
- Earned run average: 4.32
- Strikeouts: 7
- Stats at Baseball Reference

Teams
- SK Wyverns (2012); Hanshin Tigers (2015)
Medals
Men's baseball
Representing Puerto Rico
World Baseball Classic
Silver medal – second place	2013 San Francisco	Team
Silver medal – second place	2017 Los Angeles	Team

Mario Jose Santiago Hernandez (born December 16, 1984) is a Puerto Rican former baseball pitcher. He has previously played in the KBO League for the SK Wyverns and in Nippon Professional Baseball (NPB) for the Hanshin Tigers. He bats and throws right-handed.

== Career ==
Santiago was picked by the Kansas City Royals in the 2005 Major League Baseball draft and played for various minor league affiliates of the Royals between 2005 and 2011 including 19 games with the Triple-A Omaha Storm Chasers in 2011. In December 2011, Kansas City announced that they had granted Santiago his release so that he could sign to play with SK Wyverns in the KBO League. In 18 starts for the Wyverns in 2012, Santiago compiled a 6-3 record and 3.40 ERA with 49 strikeouts across 95 1/3 innings pitched. He also lost two games in the 2012 Korean Series.

On January 25, 2013, Santiago signed a minor league contract with the Los Angeles Dodgers organization. He did not appear for the organization and elected free agency following the season on November 4.

Santiago pitched for the Puerto Rico national baseball team in the 2013 World Baseball Classic, pitching 4 1/3 scoreless innings in Puerto Rico's upset victory over Japan in the WBC semi-final game, before leaving the game with a sore arm. Because of his injury he spent the entire 2013 season on the disabled list.

== Coaching Career ==
In 2026, Santiago was named as pitching coach for the DSL Royals Ventura the summer-league affiliate of the Kansas City Royals.
