= Giancarlo Alvarado =

Puerto Rican baseball player (born 1978)

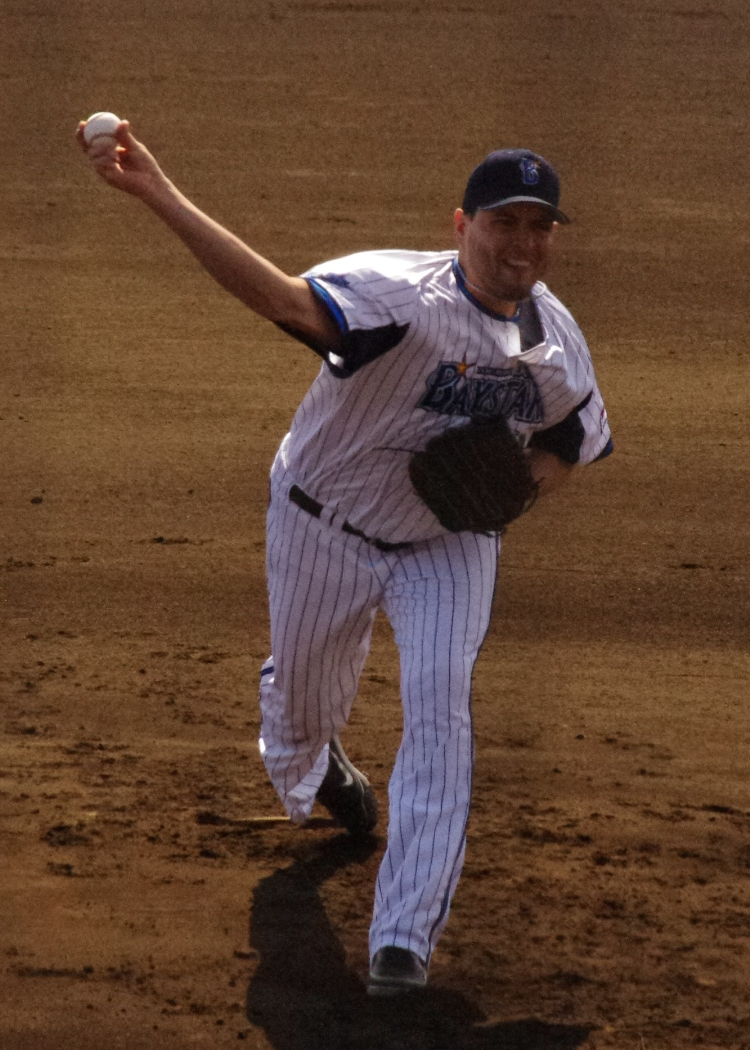
- Pitcher
- Born: January 24, 1978 (age 48); Santurce, Puerto Rico
- Batted: Right Threw: Right

Professional debut
- CPBL: June 30, 2004, for the Macoto Cobras
- NPB: March 27, 2010, for the Hiroshima Toyo Carp

Last appearance
- CPBL: October 7, 2008, for the Uni-President 7-Eleven Lions
- NPB: June 27, 2012, for the Yokohama DeNA BayStars

CPBL statistics
- Win–loss record: 1–1
- Earned run average: 3.00
- Strikeouts: 20

NPB statistics
- Win–loss record: 12–21
- Earned run average: 3.53
- Strikeouts: 227
- Stats at Baseball Reference

Teams
- Macoto Cobras (2004); Uni-President 7-Eleven Lions (2008); Hiroshima Toyo Carp (2010–2011); Yokohama DeNA BayStars (2012)
Medals
Representing Puerto Rico
Men's baseball
World Baseball Classic
Silver medal – second place	2013 San Francisco	Team

Giancarlo Carlos (Martinez) Alvarado (born January 24, 1978) is a Puerto Rican professional baseball pitcher. He played in the Chinese Professional Baseball League (CPBL) for the Macoto Cobras and Uni-President 7-Eleven Lions, and in Nippon Professional Baseball (NPB) for the Hiroshima Toyo Carp and Yokohama DeNA BayStars. He was raised in Camuy, Puerto Rico. He also played in international competitions with the Puerto Rico national baseball team.

== Playing career ==
Alvarado was signed as an undrafted free agent by the Pittsburgh Pirates in 1995 and made his professional baseball debut with the rookie-level Gulf Coast League Pirates that same year. After two seasons in the Gulf Coast League, he was promoted to the Single-A Augusta GreenJackets in 1997. He remained in the Pirates system through 2001, playing with the Lynchburg Hillcats and Double-A Altoona Curve. He also played in the Puerto Rico League in the winter of 2001.

Alvarado left the Pirates organization as a free agent in 2002 and played for the High Desert Mavericks in the Milwaukee Brewers organization in 2002 and the Lakeland Tigers and Erie SeaWolves in the Detroit Tigers organization in 2003.

Unable to land a job in the affiliated minors after the 2003 season, Alvarado pitched for the independent Lancaster Barnstormers and Newark Bears, the Macoto Cobras in Taiwan and a couple of Mexican League teams during 2004–2005.

The Cincinnati Reds picked Alvarado up for 2005 and assigned him to the Double-A Chattanooga Lookouts. He also pitched for the Puerto Rico team in the Olympic Qualifying series and for Gigantes de Carolina in the 2007 Caribbean Series.

In 2007, Alvarado pitched for Saltillo Saraperos in Mexico and in 2008 for the Salt Lake Bees in the Los Angeles Angels of Anaheim system, his first appearance at the Triple-A level. His 131 strikeouts for the Bees were third in the Pacific Coast League.

After the season, Alvarado pitched for the Uni-President 7-Eleven Lions in the Taiwan Series and the 2008 Asia Series. He then pitched for Puerto Rico in the 2009 Caribbean Series and the 2009 World Baseball Classic.

Alvarado signed a minor league contract with the Los Angeles Dodgers for the 2009 season and remained in the rotation for the Triple-A Albuquerque Isotopes for the entire season, finishing with a 13–10 record and a 3.49 ERA in 27 appearances.

In 2009–10 off season, Alvarado signed with Japan's Central League side Hiroshima Toyo Carp.

Alvarado competed in the 2013 World Baseball Classic for the Puerto Rican national baseball team. Prior to the tournament, he signed a minor league contract with the Colorado Rockies.

Alvarado signed a minor league contract with the New York Mets organization on June 6, 2013, and was assigned to the Las Vegas 51s, their Triple-A affiliate.

== Coaching career ==
Alvarado spent the 2025 season as the pitching coach for the Acereros de Monclova of the Mexican League. He was replaced in the role by Isidro Márquez on November 19, 2025.
