= Roberto Clemente Stadium =

Sports venue in Carolina, Puerto Rico

- Estadio Roberto Clemente
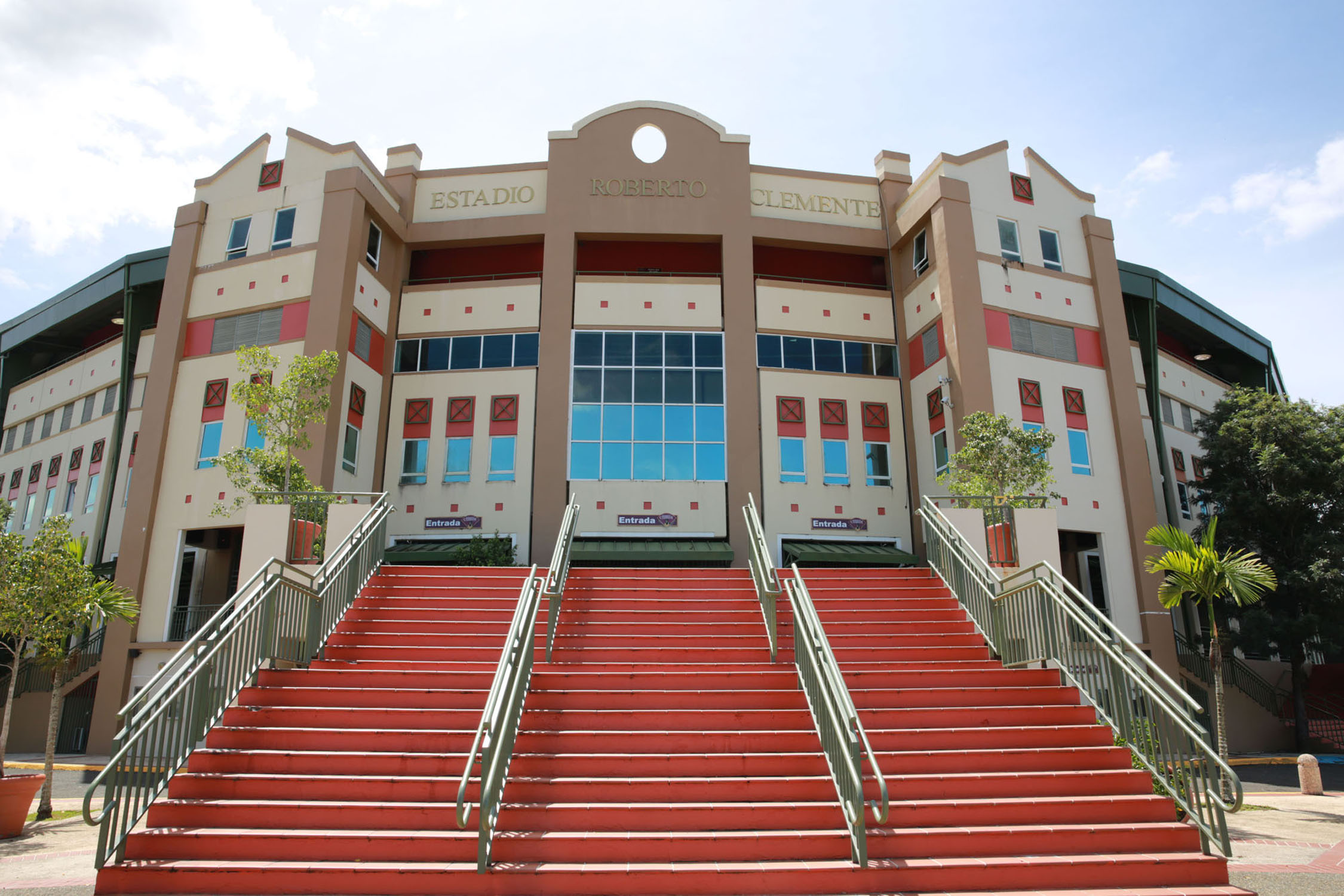
- Roberto Clemente Stadium in 2017
- Interactive map of Roberto Clemente Stadium
- Location: 65 Infantería Avenue; Carolina, Puerto Rico
- Coordinates: 18°22′36″N 65°56′57″W
- Capacity: 12,500

Construction
- Opened: 2000

Tenants
- Gigantes de Carolina (baseball); Gigantes de Carolina (football club)

Roberto Clemente Stadium (Spanish: Estadio Roberto Clemente) is a multi-purpose stadium in Carolina, Puerto Rico. It is currently used mostly for baseball games and is the home of Gigantes de Carolina. The stadium holds 12,500 people and was built in 2000. It is named after former Puerto Rican baseball great and native of Carolina, Roberto Clemente.

It hosted the 2007 Caribbean Series. From 2008 it is the home of the Gigantes de Carolina (football club) who plays in the Puerto Rico Soccer League.

It has been a venue for political campaign events, and gift-giving holiday events.
