= Christopher Gores =

Puerto Rican footballer

Personal information
- Full name: Christopher Gores
- Date of birth: 23 September 1977 (age 49)
- Place of birth: Saint Paul, Minnesota
- Position: Defender

Team information
- Current team: Gigantes de Carolina FC
- Number: 3

Senior career*
Years	Team	Apps	(Gls)
2007	Charleston Battery	6	(6)
2008	Sevilla FC Puerto Rico	14	(0)
2009–	Gigantes de Carolina FC	16	(0)

International career
2008-current	Puerto Rico	6	(0)
- * Club domestic league appearances and goals as of 9 July 2008

Christopher Gores is a Puerto Rican soccer player who plays for Gigantes de Carolina FC in the Puerto Rico Soccer League. He has also appeared for the Puerto Rico national football team.

== Career ==
Gores attended St. Paul Academy and Summit School and lead the school to a Minnesota state championship in his junior year. He later attended Stanford University to play his college career. Gores also played for the Charleston Battery of the USL First Division and Sevilla FC Puerto Rico of the Puerto Rico Soccer League, helping the team win the first ever league title.
