= St. Paul Academy and Summit School =

Private preparatory school in St. Paul, Minnesota, US

St. Paul Academy and Summit School (SPA)
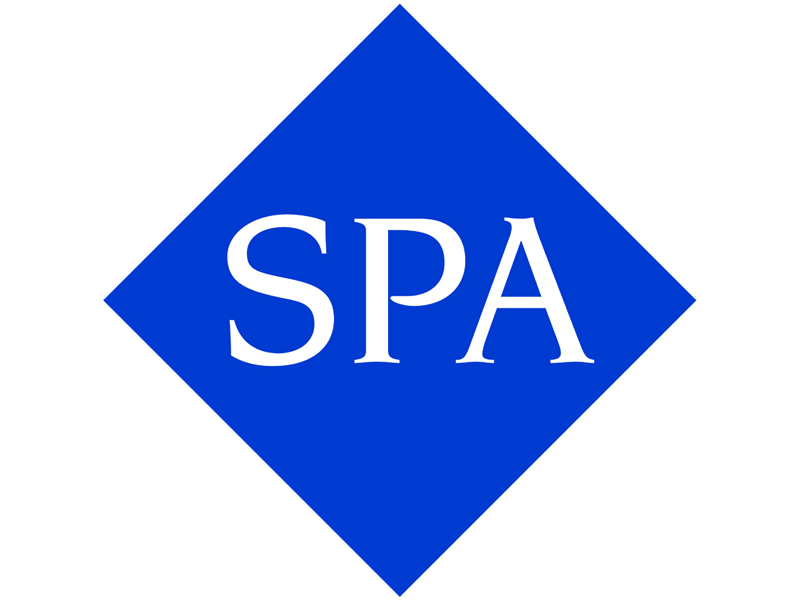

Location
- St. Paul, MN; USA; 44°55′34″N 93°10′23″W

Information
- Type: Private, day
- Motto: Shaping the minds and the hearts of the people who will change the world
- Established: SPA: 1900, Summit School: 1917, Merger: 1969
- Head of School: Luis Ottley (Now Resigned)
- Enrollment: 925 Total; 275 K–5 (Lower School); 228 6–8 (Middle School); 422 9–12 (Upper School); 128 Faculty
- Average class size: Lower School (K–5) 13 Middle School (6–8) 15 Upper School (9–12) 14
- Student to teacher ratio: 7.2:1
- Campuses: 2
- Campus type: Urban
- Colors: Navy Blue and Vegas Gold
- Athletics conference: Independent Metro Athletic Conference (IMAC)
- Mascot: Spartans
- Tuition: Lower School (K–5) $34,840 Middle School (6–8) $36,670 Upper School (9–12) $38,030
- Website: spa.edu

St. Paul Academy and Summit School is a private college preparatory day school in Saint Paul, Minnesota, United States, for students in grades K–12.

The school was established in 1969 through a merger of St. Paul Academy, a school for boys, and Summit School, a school for girls. St. Paul Academy was founded in 1900 and Summit School in 1917. Accredited by the Independent Schools Association of the Central States, SPA is a member of the National Association of Independent Schools, the Cum Laude Society, and The College Board, and is a founding member of the Association of College Counselors in Independent Schools.

== Campuses ==
The school has two campuses: the Goodrich Campus and the Randolph Campus.

- The Goodrich Campus, site of the old Summit School for girls, is the home of the Lower School (grades K–5, ~290 students) and contains the Sarah Converse Auditorium, formerly the home of SPA theater productions. It is at 1150 Goodrich Avenue.
- The Randolph Campus, site of the old St. Paul Academy for boys, is the home of the Middle School (grades 6–8, ~240 students) and the Upper School (grades 9–12, ~380 students). Drake hockey arena, the Harry M. Drake Gallery, and the Huss Center for the Performing Arts are on this campus, at 1712 Randolph Avenue.

School hours are from 8 a.m. to 3 p.m. (8:45 a.m. to 3 p.m. on Wednesdays), with exceptions for after-school activities.

== History ==
The school has two predecessor schools, The Barnard School, set up in or before 1887, and The Freeman School, set up around the same time. The Barnard School became St. Paul Academy for boys in 1900. The Freeman School became Summit School in 1916. These schools merged in 1969.

== Academics ==
In the Upper School (grades 9–12), SPA has a college-preparatory liberal arts curriculum. SPA teaches an independent curriculum that does not follow either the AP or IB curriculum models, though individual students may opt to take AP tests. Courses have been taught using Harkness tables, distinctive elliptical wooden tables that seat 12–15 students, since 2005.

== Athletics ==
SPA competes in the Independent Metro Athletic Conference (IMAC), which is part of the Minnesota State High School League. The school mascot is a Spartan, and the school's main rivals are Breck School, Blake School, and Minnehaha Academy. SPA offers 15 varsity sports and 34 teams. The school also recognizes club sports, including Ultimate Frisbee, trap shooting, and sailing.

=== Tennis ===
Several notable SPA tennis players have won state championships, including Gina Suh, who won the Minnesota State Tennis Single's Championship five years in a row. The girls' program has made over 20 state appearances, claiming the state title in 1976, 1977, 1979, 1980, 1981, 1982, 1983, 1986, and 1988, while the boys' program has made 13 appearances and won the state championship in 1993, 2004, 2007, 2008, 2022, 2023, 2024, and 2025.

== Academic teams ==
SPA has a Quiz Bowl team, which is registered with NAQT and participates in the Minnesota High School Quiz Bowl's East Division. SPA sent its A team to the NAQT High School National Championship Tournament in 2014, and both its A and B team in 2015 and 2016. It also has competitive math, chess, debate and science teams. As of the 2014–15 debate season, the debate team has made the Minnesota State High School Debate Tournament 14 straight years and 17 out of the last 18 years.

== The Rubicon ==
The Rubicon, the school's newspaper, has received the Pacemaker from the National Scholastic Press Association for ten years in a row and Crown awards from the Columbia Scholastic Press Association, the country's top awards for student journalism, consecutively since 2015.

== Notable alumni ==
- Laura Coates (1997) is an American attorney and legal analyst for CNN, as well as the host of the 11 p.m. hour of CNN Tonight. Since 2017, she has hosted a talk radio show, The Laura Coates Show, on SiriusXM's Urban View. In January 2021, The Laura Coates Show moved to SiriusXM's POTUS.
- Karen Ashe (1972) is director of Neurobiology of Alzheimer's Disease Research Laboratory at the University of Minnesota.
- Ann Bancroft (1974) was the first woman to successfully complete expeditions across the Arctic and Antarctic.
- Leo Cullen (1994) is a former soccer player.
- John Doar (1940) prominent civil rights attorney in the 1960s, who most notably defended James Meredith in his attempt to enroll in the then-segregated University of Mississippi. He was awarded the Presidential Medal of Freedom in 2012.
- F. Scott Fitzgerald attended the school from 1908 to 1911, though was asked to leave and did not graduate from the school. His works include The Great Gatsby and This Side of Paradise.
- Bill Frenzel (1946) was a member of the United States House of Representatives from Minnesota.
- Christopher Gores (1996) played soccer professionally for a team in Puerto Rico.
- Reynolds Guyer (1953) invented the Nerf children's toys, along with inventing Twister.
- Stanley S. Hubbard (1951) is the founder of Hubbard Broadcasting, which owns TV stations across Minnesota, Wisconsin, New York, and New Mexico (including the Twin Cities ABC affiliate KSTP).
- Rebecca Jarvis (1999) is a financial reporter for CNBC and was a finalist on The Apprentice (Season 4).
- Dave Kansas (1985) was the chief operating officer of American Public Media Group, a position that he assumed in 2011. Prior, Kansas was a journalist living in London and working for The Wall Street Journal.
- Roger G. Kennedy (1944) served as Director of the National Park Service and of the Smithsonian Institution's National Museum of American History. He was a Vice President of the Ford Foundation and has worked for the departments of Labor, Justice, Health and Human Services, and Education.
- Manuel Lagos (1990) Played soccer professionally and for the United States national team during the Olympics.
- Steven Levitt (1985) is the author of 2005 New York Times bestselling book Freakonomics. He led the SPA Quiz Bowl team to nationals two years consecutively.
- John C. Lilly (1933) was a neuroscientist, psychoanalyst, philosopher, and inventor, known for his research on dolphin communication and psychedelic drugs. His family is the namesake of SPA's Lilly Courtyard.
- Amos Magee (born 1971), soccer player, coach, and front office
- Anil Menon (1995) is an American physician and NASA astronaut.
- John Watson Milton was a Minnesota State Senator and writer.
- Joan Mondale (1948) was an author, advocate for the arts, and the Second Lady of the United States. She graduated from Summit School, the girls school associated with SPA (the two later merged to become St Paul Academy and Summit School).
- William Pedersen (1956), partner in Kohn Pedersen Fox Associates, is the lead architect on the Shanghai World Financial Center, one of the world's tallest buildings.
- Tony Sanneh (1990) is a professional soccer player who has won two Major League Soccer Cups and played every minute for the United States in the 2002 World Cup in Korea/Japan.
- Tim Sheehy (2004), U.S. Senator from Montana.
- John Tate (1942) was a number theorist and winner of the 2010 Abel Prize.
- Shirley Williams (attended 1940–43) was a politician and a House of Commons cabinet member in the United Kingdom
- Matthew Wolff is a graphic designer known for making soccer logos and jerseys.
