= Brant Alyea =

American baseball player (1940–2024)

- Outfielder
- Born: December 8, 1940; Passaic, New Jersey, U.S.
- Died: February 4, 2024 (aged 83); Huntingdon Valley, Pennsylvania, U.S.
- Batted: Right Threw: Right

MLB debut
- September 11, 1965, for the Washington Senators

Last MLB appearance
- July 20, 1972, for the St. Louis Cardinals

MLB statistics
- Batting average: .247
- Home runs: 38
- Runs batted in: 148
- Stats at Baseball Reference

Teams
- Washington Senators (1965, 1968–1969); Minnesota Twins (1970–1971); Oakland Athletics (1972); St. Louis Cardinals (1972)

Garrabrant Ryerson Alyea (December 8, 1940 – February 4, 2024) was an American professional baseball outfielder. He played in Major League Baseball (MLB) for the Washington Senators, Minnesota Twins, Oakland Athletics, and St. Louis Cardinals. In 1965, he became the ninth player to hit a home run on his first MLB pitch.

== Early life ==
Born in Passaic, New Jersey, Alyea grew up in Rutherford, New Jersey and graduated from Rutherford High School, where he played basketball and quarterbacked the football team, in addition to baseball.

== Career ==
Originally signed by the Cincinnati Reds, Alyea was drafted a year later by the Washington Senators. Alyea made his major league debut on September 12, 1965. Called to the plate as a pinch hitter, he hit a home run off Los Angeles Angels pitcher Rudy May on the first pitch he saw in the Majors.

His most productive season came in 1970 for the Minnesota Twins, when he posted career numbers in batting average (.291) home runs (16) and runs batted in (61), including seven-RBI games on April 7 (Opening Day) and September 7.

Alyea was sent to the Texas Rangers on December 1, 1972, completing a trade from 33 days prior on October 30 involving the Oakland Athletics acquiring Paul Lindblad for Bill McNulty.

In between, Alyea played winter ball for the Cardenales de Lara, Tiburones de La Guaira and Tigres de Aragua clubs of the Venezuelan Professional Baseball League, leading the circuit in home runs in 1968 (17) and 1971 (12), and for RBI in 1971 (36). In addition, he played with the VPBL champion Tigres in the 1972 Caribbean Series.

== Later life ==
After his baseball playing days were over, Alyea oversaw the crap tables at the Tropicana Casino & Resort in Atlantic City, New Jersey.

Alyea died on February 4, 2024, at the age of 83.

== See also ==
- Home run in first Major League at-bat
