= Gigantes de Carolina FC =

Association football club based in Carolina, Puerto Rico

Carolina Giants
- Full name: Puerto Rico Giants de Carolina
- Founded: 1998
- Stadium: Roberto Clemente Stadium; Carolina, Puerto Rico
- Capacity: 12,500
- Chairman: Esdras Cruz Strazzara
- Manager: Ricardo Romano
- League: Puerto Rico Soccer League
- 2009: 5th
Home colors	Away colors

Carolina Giants are an association football club from Carolina, Puerto Rico. They were formed in 2008 as the football branch of the existing baseball side Gigantes de Carolina. They are founding members of the Puerto Rico Soccer League, the first nationwide football league on the island. They play their matches at the Roberto Clemente Stadium which is primarily a baseball venue.

== History ==
=== Puerto Rico Soccer League ===
==== 2008 season ====
Carolina Giants debuted on July 6, 2008, in a game against Guaynabo Fluminense FC, which concluded with both teams tied 2–2. On its second game the team defeated Tornados de Humacao five goals to one. On July 19, 2008, the Gigantes won its second consecutive game against Caguas Huracán. In their fourth game, the team lost to Club Atletico River Plate Puerto Rico, three goals to one. On the fifth date of the tournament the team tied with Academia Quintana, with both team scoring a single goal. On August 10, 2008, Carolina lost to Atlético de San Juan FC. This marked the end of the league's first half, the teams would then compete against each other a second time. In the first two games of this stage, Gigantes de Carolina lost to Sevilla FC and Guaynabo Fluminense. To close the regular season, the team won 1, lost 4 and tied 1 games.

==== 2009 season ====
Carolina Gigantes FC won their first game 2-1 against Academia Quintana. They ended their season in 5th place. Missing the playoffs by one position.

Puerto Rico Soccer League
Season	Position
2008-09	6th
2009-10	5th

== Club hierarchy ==
Gigantes de Carolina Ltd.

Chairman: Ricardo Romano

Gigantes de Carolina plc.

Vice President : Yessica Yulfo

Club treasure : Carlos Román

Club Secretary : Annette Miro

== Achievements ==
- Liga Mayor de Fútbol Nacional: 0

Runners-up (1): 2000

- Liga Premier de Fútbol de Puerto Rico: 0

Runners-up (1): 2007

== Current squad ==
Note: Flags indicate national team as defined under FIFA eligibility rules; some limited exceptions apply. Players may hold more than one non-FIFA nationality.

No.	Pos.	Nation	Player
3	MF	PUR	Lionel Jackson
5	MF	PUR	Carlos Torres Rivera
8	DF	PER	Flavio Vilca
9	FW	PUR	Carlos Astondoa
10	MF	PUR	Oscar Sánchez Martínez
11	FW	PUR	Efraín Torres Centeno
14	MF	PUR	Irving Flores
15	MF	PUR	Carlos Morales
16	MF	PUR	Mauricio A. Turizo Pulido
20	MF	PUR	Kenny Amaba
1	GK	PUR	Justo Rivas
—	GK	PUR	Oswaldo Herrera
—	DF	DOM	Wally Contreras
—	DF	PUR	Ernesto Guerrero
—	DF	PUR	Gustavo Rizzo
—	DF	PUR	Christian Vega

No.	Pos.	Nation	Player
—	DF	PUR	Luis A. Mussenden
—	DF	PUR	José Valle Riefkohl
—	FW	USA	Nsouleyman N
—	DF	PUR	Félix Calderón
—	DF	PUR	Christopher Gores
—	DF	PUR	Luis Cerna
—	DF	PUR	Alexe Torres Zierath
—	DF	PUR	Joel González
—	DF	PUR	Julio Zafra
—	DF	PUR	Christian Turizo
—	DF	PUR	Eduardo Núñez
—	DF	DOM	Ramón Mariano
—	DF	COL	Mauricio Turizo
—	DF	USA	Adam Owens
—	FW	PUR	Jorge A. Nadal
—	FW	USA	Nick Webb
