= José Fernández (third baseman) =

Dominican baseball player (born 1974)

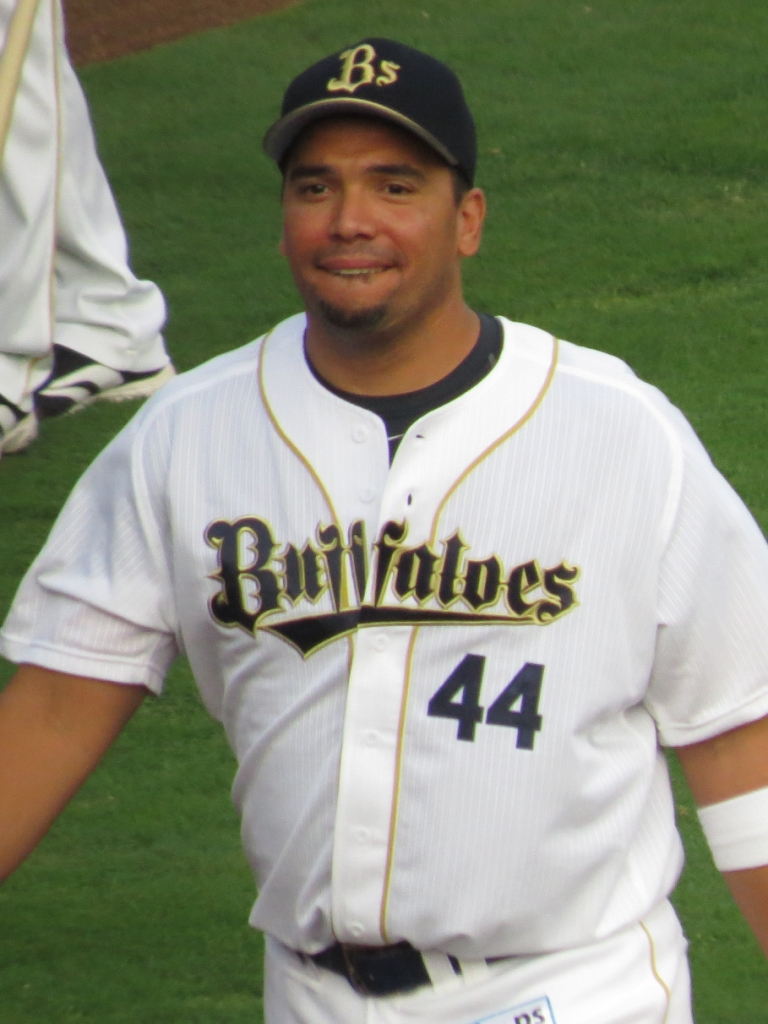
- Fernández for the Orix Buffaloes in 2013
- Third baseman
- Born: November 2, 1974 (age 51); La Vega, Dominican Republic
- Batted: Right Threw: Right

Professional debut
- MLB: July 3, 1999, for the Montreal Expos
- KBO: 2002, for the SK Wyverns
- NPB: April 18, 2003, for the Chiba Lotte Marines

Last appearance
- MLB: 2001, for the Anaheim Angels
- KBO: 2002, for the SK Wyverns
- NPB: September 22, 2013, for the Orix Buffaloes

MLB statistics
- Batting average: .143
- Home runs: 0
- Runs batted in: 1

NPB statistics
- Batting average: .282
- Home runs: 206
- Runs batted in: 772
- OPS: .820
- Stats at Baseball Reference

Teams
- Montreal Expos (1999); Anaheim Angels (2001); SK Wyverns (2002); Chiba Lotte Marines (2003); Seibu Lions (2004–2005); Tohoku Rakuten Golden Eagles (2006–2008); Orix Buffaloes (2009); Saitama Seibu Lions (2010–2011); Tohoku Rakuten Golden Eagles (2012); Orix Buffaloes (2013)

Career highlights and awards
- 1× Best Nine Award (2006)

José Mayobanex Fernández Rojas (born November 2, 1974) is a Dominican former third baseman in Major League Baseball, the KBO League, Nippon Professional Baseball (NPB), and the Dominican Winter Baseball League. He played eleven years in the NPB, compiling a .282 batting average with 206 home runs and 772 runs batted in.

Fernández played briefly in Major League Baseball for the Montreal Expos (1999) and the Anaheim Angels (2001). He just hit .143 in 49 at-bats during his MLB career.

After a successful season in Korea in 2002 with the SK Wyverns, in 2003 Fernández came to Japan to play Nippon Professional Baseball. He played one season for the Chiba Lotte Marines in 2003, and then two seasons for the Seibu Lions in 2004–2005. Fernández was a key member of the 2004 Japan Series-champion Lions team.

Moving to the Tohoku Rakuten Golden Eagles, he played for that team for three seasons, in 2006–2008. While playing for the Golden Eagles, he was a Pacific League Best Nine Award-winner at third base in 2006. On April 1, 2007, Fernández and Takeshi Yamasaki hit grand slams in the same inning for the Golden Eagles. Fernández led the Golden Eagles in RBI in 2008, with 99.

Fernández played for the champion Dominican Republic national baseball team in the 2007 Caribbean Series.

Fernández played for the Orix Buffaloes in 2009 and then returned to the Saitama Seibu Lions franchise for 2010–2011. He returned to the Golden Eagles in 2012, and then returned to the Buffaloes for his final season, 2013.

After briefly playing in Mexican League for the Tigres de Quintana Roo in 2010, Fernández was signed by the Seibu Lions on a ¥30million deal to the end of the season.
