= Carlos Morales (footballer, born 1982) =

American-born Puerto Rican footballer

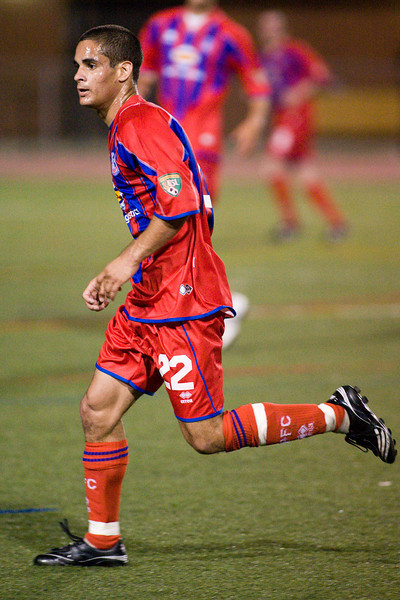

Personal information
- Place of birth: Freehold, New Jersey, United States
- Height: 5 ft 6 in (1.68 m)
- Position: Midfielder

Senior career*
Years	Team	Apps	(Gls)
2006–2007	Harrisburg City Islanders	11	(1)
2008	Crystal Palace Baltimore	7	(0)
2009	Gigantes de Carolina FC	16	(5)
2010	Puerto Rico Islanders	0	(0)

International career^{‡}
2008–2010	Puerto Rico	2	(0)
- * Club domestic league appearances and goals as of 10 August 2008 ‡ National team caps and goals as of 14 June 2010

Carlos Morales, (born September 11, United States) is an American-born Puerto Rican soccer player who plays as a midfielder for Gigantes de Carolina FC of the Puerto Rico Soccer League and the Puerto Rico national football team.

== Career statistics ==
(correct as of 27 September 2008)

Club	Season	League			Cup			Play-Offs			Total		
Club	Season	Apps	Goals 1	Assists	Apps	Goals	Assists	Apps	Goals 2	Assists	Apps	Goals	Assists
Harrisburg City Islanders	2006	5	0	0	?	?	?	?	?	?	5	0	?
Crystal Palace Baltimore	2008-	7	0	0	1	0	0	0	0	0	8	0	0
Total	2008–present	7	0	0	1	0	0	0	0	0	8	0	0
Career Total	2007–present	12	0	0	1	0	0	0	0	0	13	0	0
