= Efraín Nieves =

Puerto Rican baseball pitcher (born 1989)

- Pitcher
- Born: November 15, 1989 (age 36); Caguas, Puerto Rico
- Bats: Left Throws: Left

CPBL debut
- May 31, 2016, for the Lamigo Monkeys

CPBL statistics (through 2016 season)
- Win–loss record: 7–3
- Earned run average: 6.12
- Strikeouts: 53
- Stats at Baseball Reference

Teams
- Lamigo Monkeys (2016)
Medals
Men's baseball
Representing Puerto Rico
World Baseball Classic
Silver medal – second place	2013 San Francisco	Team
Pan American Games
Gold medal – first place	2019 Lima	Team
Central American and Caribbean Games
Gold medal – first place	2018 Barranquilla	Team

Efraín Nieves (born November 15, 1989) is a Puerto Rican former professional baseball pitcher. He has previously played in the Chinese Professional Baseball League (CPBL) for the Lamigo Monkeys.

== Career ==
=== Milwaukee Brewers ===
Nieves attended the Puerto Rico Baseball Academy. The Milwaukee Brewers drafted Nieves in the seventh round of the 2007 Major League Baseball draft. After playing rookie ball in 2007 and 2008, Nieves was promoted to the Single-A Wisconsin Timber Rattlers for the 2009 season. He would spend the entire 2010 season for the Timber Rattlers as well, pitching to a 5.56 ERA with 53 strikeouts and 41 walks. Nieves was promoted to the advanced Single-A Brevard County Manatees in 2011, where he spent the season. On March 26, 2012, Nieves was released by the Brewers.

=== Detroit Tigers ===
On April 24, 2012, Nieves signed a minor league contract with the Detroit Tigers organization. Nieves spent the year with the low Single-A Connecticut Tigers and re-signed with the Tigers on a minor league contract on November 26.

=== Toronto Blue Jays ===
On December 6, 2012, Nieves was selected by the Toronto Blue Jays in the minor league phase of the Rule 5 Draft. Nieves spent the 2013 season with the Single-A Lansing Lugnuts and the advanced Single-A Dunedin Blue Jays. Nieves remained in Dunedin in 2014 and became a free agent after the season.

=== Texas Rangers ===
On November 20, 2014, Nieves signed a minor league contract with the Texas Rangers organization. Nieves was released before the season on March 4, 2015.

=== Evansville Otters ===
Nieves signed with the Evansville Otters of the Frontier League following his release from the Rangers organization. In his first Frontier League start on May 20, 2015, Nieves pitched six innings of one hit, no runs ball with five strikeouts.

=== Somerset Patriots ===
On April 9, 2016, Nieves signed with the Somerset Patriots of the Atlantic League of Professional Baseball.

=== Lamigo Monkeys ===
On May 28, 2016, Nieves signed with the Lamigo Monkeys of the Chinese Professional Baseball League.

=== Somerset Patriots (second stint) ===
On June 22, 2017, Nieves signed with the Somerset Patriots of the Atlantic League of Professional Baseball. Nieves pitched to a 3.95 ERA with 63 strikeouts in 73 innings pitched across 16 games.

== International career ==
Nieves played for the Puerto Rican national baseball team in the 2013 World Baseball Classic. He was selected to Puerto Rico's roster for the 2019 Pan American Games.
