= Fernando Martínez (baseball) =

Dominican baseball player (born 1988)

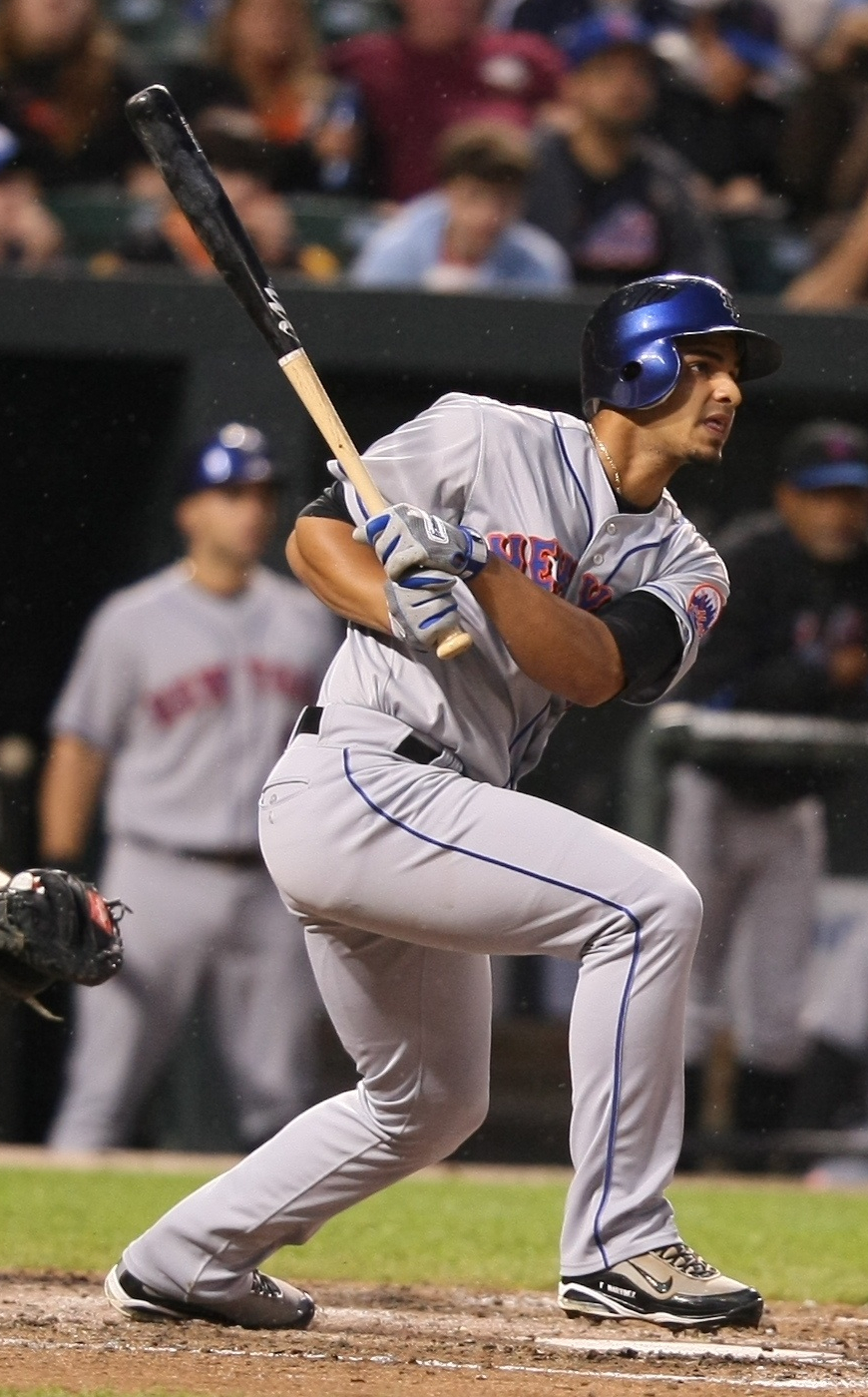
- Martinez with the Mets in 2009
- Outfielder
- Born: October 10, 1988 (age 38); Río San Juan, Dominican Republic
- Batted: Left Threw: Right

MLB debut
- May 26, 2009, for the New York Mets

Last MLB appearance
- May 5, 2013, for the Houston Astros

MLB statistics
- Batting average: .206
- Home runs: 9
- Runs batted in: 29
- Stats at Baseball Reference

Teams
- New York Mets (2009–2011); Houston Astros (2012–2013)

Fernando Martínez Álvarez (born October 10, 1988) is a Dominican former professional baseball outfielder. He played in Major League Baseball (MLB) with the New York Mets and Houston Astros. He bats left-handed and throws right-handed.

By the summer of 2009, Martínez was estimated of a net worth of $1.7 million. He was one of 14 players suspended for taking part in the Biogenesis baseball scandal. His most famous relationship was with Paola Brens between 2011 and 2013. Later that year, they welcomed a son named Gael Martinez in December 2013. He played for Team Spain in the 2019 European Baseball Championship. He then played for the team at the Africa/Europe 2020 Olympic Qualification tournament, in Italy in September 2019,

== Career ==
=== New York Mets ===
Martínez signed with the Mets in July 2005 as an international free agent, when he was 16 years old. Mets general manager Omar Minaya, known for his ability to attract Latin American talent to the Mets, lured Martínez with a signing bonus of $1.4 million. Minaya said of the signing "What we saw in [Martinez] was a 16-year-old kid with power, great ability and great character, above everything else.”

Martínez had played center field in the minor leagues since the 2007 season with Double-A Binghamton. He was selected to both the 2007 and 2008 All-Star Futures Games. Martínez was considered by many to be a potential 5-tool player at the major league level.

Baseball America named him as the Mets Number One Prospect for 2007 and 2008.

Martinez then saw his status as a blue chip prospect decline over the next few years, due in large part to his frequent stints on the disabled list. For example, Martinez was ranked as the Number 1 prospect in the Mets' organization by Scout.com in 2009 and 2010. In 2011, he was dropped to Number 4. Similarly, ESPN Scout Keith Law ranked Martinez as the Number 10 overall prospect in 2008, and then as the Number 16 overall prospect in 2009, but dropped him to Number 73 overall in 2010. Due to his accumulated time on the major league roster, Martinez' prospect status expired after 2010.

After batting .291 with 8 home runs and leading the International League with 25 extra-base hits in 42 games with AAA Buffalo, Martínez was called up to the major leagues on May 26 as José Reyes and Ryan Church were placed on the disabled list. He went 0–3 with 2 strikeouts, a fielder's choice, a hit by pitch, and an RBI. He hit his first career home run against the Brewers on June 30 in a 6–3 loss.

After appearing in 11 games for the Mets in the majors and batting just .227 with an On Base Percentage of .261. The Mets waived Martinez on January 9, 2012, after years of injuries and disappointing progress.

=== Houston Astros ===
On January 11, 2012, Martínez was claimed off waivers by the Houston Astros. He was designated for assignment on May 6, 2013.

In 2012 Martinez played well for the Astros AAA team with a slash line of .314 / .367 / .507. However, Martinez struggled to perform in the Majors. The next year Martinez struggled in both the minors and majors for Houston.

=== New York Yankees ===
On June 18, 2013, Martínez was traded from the Astros to the New York Yankees for minor league pitcher Charles Basford.

On August 5, 2013, Martínez was suspended 50 games by the MLB for violating its drug policy and connection to Biogenesis.

=== Rojos del Aguila de Veracruz ===
On February 6, 2015, Martínez signed with the Rojos del Aguila de Veracruz of the Mexican League. In 7 games he struggled mightily going 5-28 (.179) with 1 home run and 5 RBIs.

== Coaching career ==
In 2024, Martínez was named hitting coach of the DSL Royals Fortuna the Dominican Summer League affiliate of the Kansas City Royals.

In 2025, he was named hitting coach of the DSL Royals Ventura the Dominican Summer League affiliate of the Kansas City Royals.
