= Adrian Garrett =

American baseball player and coach (1943–2021)

- Utility player
- Born: January 3, 1943; Brooksville, Florida, U.S.
- Died: April 22, 2021 (aged 78); Kyle, Texas, U.S.
- Batted: Left Threw: Right

MLB debut
- April 13, 1966, for the Atlanta Braves

Last MLB appearance
- July 11, 1976, for the California Angels

MLB statistics
- Batting average: .185
- Home runs: 11
- Runs batted in: 37

NPB statistics
- Batting average: .260
- Home runs: 102
- Runs batted in: 247
- Stats at Baseball Reference

Teams
- Atlanta Braves (1966); Chicago Cubs (1970); Oakland Athletics (1971–1972); Chicago Cubs (1973–1975); California Angels (1975–1976); Hiroshima Toyo Carp (1977–1979)

Henry Adrian Garrett Jr. (January 3, 1943 – April 22, 2021), nicknamed "Pat" and "Smokey", was an American professional baseball player and coach. A utility man in Major League Baseball, he appeared in 163 total games during eight seasons between 1966 and 1976 for the Atlanta Braves, Chicago Cubs, Oakland Athletics and California Angels. He batted left-handed, threw right-handed, and was listed at 6 feet 3 inches (1.91 m) tall and 185 pounds (84 kg).

== Early life ==
Garrett was born in Brooksville, Florida, on January 3, 1943, to parents Henry Sr., a machine operator, and Iva Garrett. His family relocated to nearby Sarasota when he was six years old. Garrett attended Sarasota High School, where he played baseball and football. After graduating in 1961, he was signed as an amateur free agent by Zack Taylor of the Milwaukee Braves on June 15 that same year.

== Playing career ==
Garrett played in the minor leagues from the 1961 to 1966 seasons. He made his MLB debut on April 13, 1966, at the age of 23, entering as a pinch hitter and popping out in his only at bat in a 6–0 loss to the Pittsburgh Pirates. However, he appeared in only four games as a Brave that year and went hitless in three at bats. He did not return to MLB until September 1970 as a member of the Cubs, going 0-for-3 with three strikeouts as a pinch hitter.

Late in the 1971 season, the Cubs traded Garrett to the Oakland Athletics for Frank Fernández and Bill McNulty. He did not collect his first major league hit until his first game with the Athletics in September 1971. In the 1971-72 offseason, Garret played with Águilas Cibaeñas in the Dominican League. He spent parts of the 1972–1976 seasons in the majors as a pinch hitter, designated hitter, and spare outfielder, catcher and first baseman. He struggled offensively, compiling a .185 batting average, with 51 hits, (including eight doubles and 11 home runs) and 37 runs batted in.

After the 1972 season, he played for Estrellas Orientales in the Dominical League. He was back in Venezuelan Winter League in 1974-75 playing with Tigres de Aragua. In 1976 he established a Venezuela Winter League record by getting a hit in 28 consecutive games as a member of Leones del Caracas.

Garrett later played for the Hiroshima Carp in Japan, hitting 102 home runs in three seasons. Garrett's 1979 Hiroshima team won the Japan Series against Charlie Manuel and the Kintetsu Buffaloes.

== Coaching career ==
Garrett began his off-field career in 1982 as a minor-league manager in the Chicago White Sox' farm system. He then became a hitting instructor in the ChiSox' organization, and served for five seasons (1988–1992) at the big-league level as the third-base and hitting coach of the Kansas City Royals. He then moved into the Florida Marlins' organization, spending ten years as a minor league coach. More recently, he was hitting coach for the Louisville Bats, the Triple-A affiliate of the Cincinnati Reds, from 2003 to 2011. From 2012 to 2015, Garrett was a part-time batting instructor for Cincinnati during spring training, post-draft mini-camp, instructional league and the regular season.

== Personal life ==
Garrett met Linda Jean Thurman in 1963. They married five years later and had two children, Jason and Angela. The family resided in Austin, and he remained married until his death. He was inducted into the Tacoma Baseball Hall of Fame in 1993. Fifteen years later, he was honored in the Appleton Baseball Hall of Fame. His younger brother Wayne was an MLB third baseman and a member of the 1969 World Series champion New York Mets.

Garrett died on April 22, 2021, at the Ascension Seton Hays Hospital in Kyle, Texas. He was 78, and suffered from pneumonia prior to his death.
