= Winston Llenas =

Dominican baseball player (born 1943)

- Utility player
- Born: September 23, 1943 (age 83); Santiago, Dominican Republic
- Batted: Right Threw: Right

MLB debut
- August 15, 1968, for the California Angels

Last MLB appearance
- September 14, 1975, for the California Angels

MLB statistics
- Batting average: .230
- Home runs: 3
- Runs batted in: 61

NPB statistics
- Batting average: .227
- Home runs: 6
- Runs batted in: 19
- Stats at Baseball Reference

Teams
- California Angels (1968–1969, 1972–1975); Taiheiyo Club Lions (1976)

Member of the Caribbean

Baseball Hall of Fame
- Induction: 2008

Winston Enriquillo Llenas Dávila (a.k.a. Chilote) (born September 23, 1943) is a Dominican former Major League Baseball infielder and outfielder who played for the California Angels from 1968 to 1969, and again from 1972 to 1975. He also played one season in Japan for the Taiheiyo Club Lions in 1976.

== Early life and family ==
Llenas was born to Rafael Antonio Llenas Díaz (the son of Enrique Llenas Domínguez and Mercedes Díaz Andreu) and Magda Aracelis Dávila; he had four brothers and five sisters. Winston’s paternal grandparents had Catalan roots.

== Career ==
Llenas signed with the Kansas City Athletics as an amateur free agent before the 1961 season, then was released by them on June 16, 1962. He had played in 153 games for the A's organization in the Sophomore League and the Florida State League, batting .232 and committing 60 errors. About 5 1/2 months later, at age 19, he signed as a free agent with the Los Angeles Angels. (December 2, 1962)

As Llenas grew older, he became a solid minor league hitter. He made his major league debut on August 15, 1968 against the Washington Senators at Anaheim Stadium. He started at third base, batted sixth in the lineup, and went 1-for-3 with a double and a run scored in a 3–1 win over starting pitcher Frank Bertaina. Typically, he made a throwing error on the first ground ball hit to him.

His best season was 1973, when he led the American League in pinch-hits (16) and pinch-hit at-bats (56). He also had career highs in games played (78), batting average (.269), and runs batted in (25). He was used quite often as a pinch-hitter throughout his MLB career. The most games he started at any one position was at third base. His best position, however, was second base, where he handled 111 total chances without making a single error.

Career totals for 300 games include a .230 batting average (122-for-531), 3 HR, 61 RBI, and 50 runs scored.

In the Dominican Winter League he has been a champion in 19 of the 20 crowns of Aguilas Cibaeñas as a player, manager, general manager and president.

In 2008, Llenas gained induction into the Caribbean Baseball Hall of Fame as part of its 12th Class.

Llenas served as the bench coach for the Toronto Blue Jays under then manager Jimy Williams during the 1988 Major League Baseball season in his only year on the team's coaching staff wearing uniform number 57.

== Facts ==
- Pinch-hitting for Nolan Ryan with two out in the bottom of the 9th against Milwaukee Brewers starter Earl Stephenson, banged a walk-off single to right to win the game, 1–0. {Anaheim Stadium—July 5, 1972}
- Hit a combined .323 (20-for-62) against All-Star pitchers Vida Blue, Jim Kaat, Sparky Lyle, Mel Stottlemyre, and Wilbur Wood

== Minor league highlights ==
- Hit .346 for the Tri-City Angels of the Northwest League in 1964
- Tied for the Texas League lead in home runs with 25 while playing for the El Paso Sun Kings in 1966
- Led the Mexican League with 113 RBI while playing for the Charros de Jalisco in 1967
- Led the Pacific Coast League with 108 RBI while playing for the Hawaii Islanders in 1970
