= Tigres de Aragua =

- Logo

Information
- League: Venezuelan Professional Baseball League
- Location: Maracay, Aragua
- Ballpark: Estadio José Pérez Colmenares
- Founded: October 15, 1965
- Caribbean Series championships: 1 (2009)
- League championships: 1971–72, 1974–75, 1975–76, 2003–04, 2004–05, 2006–07, 2007–08, 2008–09, 2011–12, 2015–16
- President: (Venezuela) Víctor Zambrano
- Coach: (United States) Buddy Bailey
- Website: https://tigresdearaguabbc.com/

Current uniforms
Home	Away

Tigres de Aragua (English: Aragua Tigers) is a baseball team that plays in the Venezuelan Professional Baseball League and represents the state of Aragua.

Founded in 1965, the Tigres plays its home games at the Estadio José Pérez Colmenares in Maracay. The team won the Venezuelan National Series Championship for the third time in 2009, by defeating the Leones del Caracas at the UCV Stadium, 7–2, in the seventh game of a best-of-seven series. This championship made it their third in a row and eighth in history, including five of the prior six years.

The Tigres won their first Caribbean World Series title in 2009. Their most recent championship was in the 2015–2016 season, when they defeated Navegantes del Magallanes in six playoff games.

== Championships ==
Season	Manager	Record	Series score	Runner-up
1971–72	Rod Carew	32-28	4–3	Tiburones de La Guaira
1974–75	Osvaldo Virgil	32-28	4–2	Navegantes del Magallanes
1975–76	Osvaldo Virgil	31-33	4–3	Cardenales de Lara
2003–04	Buddy Bailey	34-28	4–2	Caribes de Anzoátegui
2004–05	Buddy Bailey	31-31	4–3	Leones del Caracas
2006–07	Buddy Bailey	41-21	4–1	Navegantes del Magallanes
2007–08	Buddy Bailey	32-31	4–1	Cardenales de Lara
2008–09	Buddy Bailey	36-27	4–3	Leones del Caracas
2011–12	Buddy Bailey	31-30	4–2	Tiburones de La Guaira
2015–16	Eddie Perez	31-32	4–2	Navegantes del Magallanes
Total championships			10	

== Caribbean Series appearances ==
- 1972
- 1975
- 1976
- 2004
- 2005
- 2007
- 2008
- 2009
- 2016

== Retired numbers ==
11; Luis Aparicio; SS; Retired	13; David Concepción; SS; Retired	18; Jesús Méndez; C Retired	20; Roberto Muñoz; P Retired	36; Roberto Zambrano; OF; Retired	47; Rosman García; P Retired

== Current roster ==
Tigres de Aragua 2020-21 Roster
Players		Coaches
Pitchers: 54 (Venezuela) Ronald Belisario; 39 (Dominican Republic) Wander Beras; 21 (Venezuela) Luis Carrasco; 60 (Mexico) Marco Carrillo; 32 (Venezuela) Enrique Castillo; 50 (Dominican Republic) Logan Duran; 90 (Cuba) Noelvis Entenza; 52 (Venezuela) Eduardo Figueroa; 59 (Venezuela) Ramon García; 48 (Cuba) Pablo Guillén; 57 (Venezuela) Ismael Guillòn; 98 (Venezuela) Dedgar Jimenez; 55 (Venezuela) Jose Martinez; 33 (Venezuela) Jhondaniel Medina; 31 (Venezuela) Yoervis Medina; 73 (Venezuela) Osmar Morales; 70 (Venezuela) Guillermo Moscoso; 64 (Venezuela) Ángel Nesbitt; 21 (Dominican Republic) Wirfin Obispo; 22 (Venezuela) Anthony Ortega; 65 (Venezuela) Angel Padron; -- (Venezuela) Jesus Parra; -- (Venezuela) Jesus Pirela; 46 (Venezuela) Henry Rodríguez; 75 (Venezuela) Rómulo Sánchez; 27 (Venezuela) Elio Silva; 45 (Venezuela) Alexis Tapia; 66 (Venezuela) Luis Ysla; updated on 14 June 2021	Catchers: 38 (Venezuela) Ramón Cabrera; 56 (Venezuela) Wilfredo Gimenez; 28 (Venezuela) Alex Monsalve; 30 (Venezuela) Gersel Pitre; Infielders: 02 (Venezuela) Alexi Amarista; 10 (Venezuela) Jose R. Flores; 35 (Venezuela) Carlos Garcia; 06 (Venezuela) Edwin Garcia; 12 (Venezuela) Alberto González; 00 (Cuba) Yosmany Guerra; 15 (Venezuela) Hernán Pérez; 07 (Venezuela) Leobaldo Piña; 09 (Venezuela) Henry Rodríguez; Outfielders: 53 (Venezuela) Carlos Arroyo; 77 (Dominican Republic) Yeison Asencio; 12 (Venezuela) Ramón Flores; 41 (Venezuela) Anthony Jimenez; 16 (Venezuela) Jose Rangel; 01 (Cuba) Roel Santos	Manager: 08 (Venezuela) Luis Ugueto; Coaches: 37 (Venezuela) Clemente Álvarez (Bullpen); 29 (Venezuela) Aarom Baldiris (Hitting); -- (Venezuela) Jorge González (First Base); -- (Venezuela) Gustavo Molina (Bench); 42 (Venezuela) Orber Moreno (Pitching); -- (Venezuela) Silverio Navas (Third Base); (Coaching staff for 2021-2022 season)

== All-time roster ==
- Tommie Aaron
- Paul Abbott
- Teolindo Acosta
- Edgardo Alfonzo
- Brant Alyea
- Oscar Azócar
- Brian Bass
- John Bateman
- Yorman Bazardo
- Ronald Belisario
- Dámaso Blanco
- Lyman Bostock
- Bob Brenly
- Bob Burda
- Sal Butera
- Enos Cabell
- Miguel Cabrera
- Bill Campbell
- Rod Carew
- Chico Carrasquel
- Rico Carty
- Pedro Castellano
- Ramón Castro
- Ronny Cedeño
- Raúl Chávez
- David Concepción
- Tim Corcoran
- Jerry Cram
- Steve Crawford
- Darren Daulton
- Víctor Davalillo
- Alex Delgado
- Argenis Díaz
- Rawly Eastwick
- Jim Edmonds
- Dick Egan
- Dave Engle
- Eduardo Escobar
- Horacio Estrada
- Seth Etherton
- Dan Ford
- Ted Ford
- Sam Fuld
- Rich Gale
- Richard Garcés
- Avisail García
- Freddy García
- Rosman García
- Phil Garner
- Adrian Garrett
- Héctor Giménez
- Dan Gladden
- Germán González
- Tom Grieve
- Tim Harikkala
- Roric Harrison
- Leonardo Hernández
- Rich Hill
- Jim Holt
- Tim Hosley
- Dave Hudgens
- Torii Hunter
- Enrique Izquierdo
- Von Joshua
- Joe Kerrigan
- Duane Kuiper
- Bill Landrum
- Jason Lane
- Wilfredo Ledezma
- Steve Luebber
- Mike Lum
- Rick Lysander
- Anderson Machado
- Héctor Maestri
- Luis Maza
- Terry McGriff
- José Mijares
- George Mitterwald
- Víctor Moreno
- Roberto Muñoz
- Graig Nettles
- Ron Oester
- Ray Olmedo
- Paul O'Neill
- Jim Pankovits
- Larry Parrish
- Mike Pazik
- Eddie Pérez
- Yohan Pino
- Leopoldo Posada
- Ted Power
- Juan Carlos Pulido
- Wilson Ramos
- Ken Ray
- Luis Rodríguez
- Juan Rivera
- Cookie Rojas
- Alex Romero
- Pablo Sandoval
- Manny Sarmiento
- Skip Schumaker
- Diego Seguí
- Hernán Silva
- Yangervis Solarte
- Lester Straker
- Rick Sutcliffe
- Mickey Tettleton
- Kevin Tolar
- Tim Tolman
- Gary Ward
- Terry Whitfield
- Milt Wilcox
- Mark Wiley
- Jim Willoughby
- Joel Youngblood
- Pat Zachry
- Eduardo Zambrano

== See also ==
- Tigres de Aragua players
- Venezuelan Professional Baseball League
