= Oscar Salazar (baseball) =

Venezuelan baseball player (born 1978)

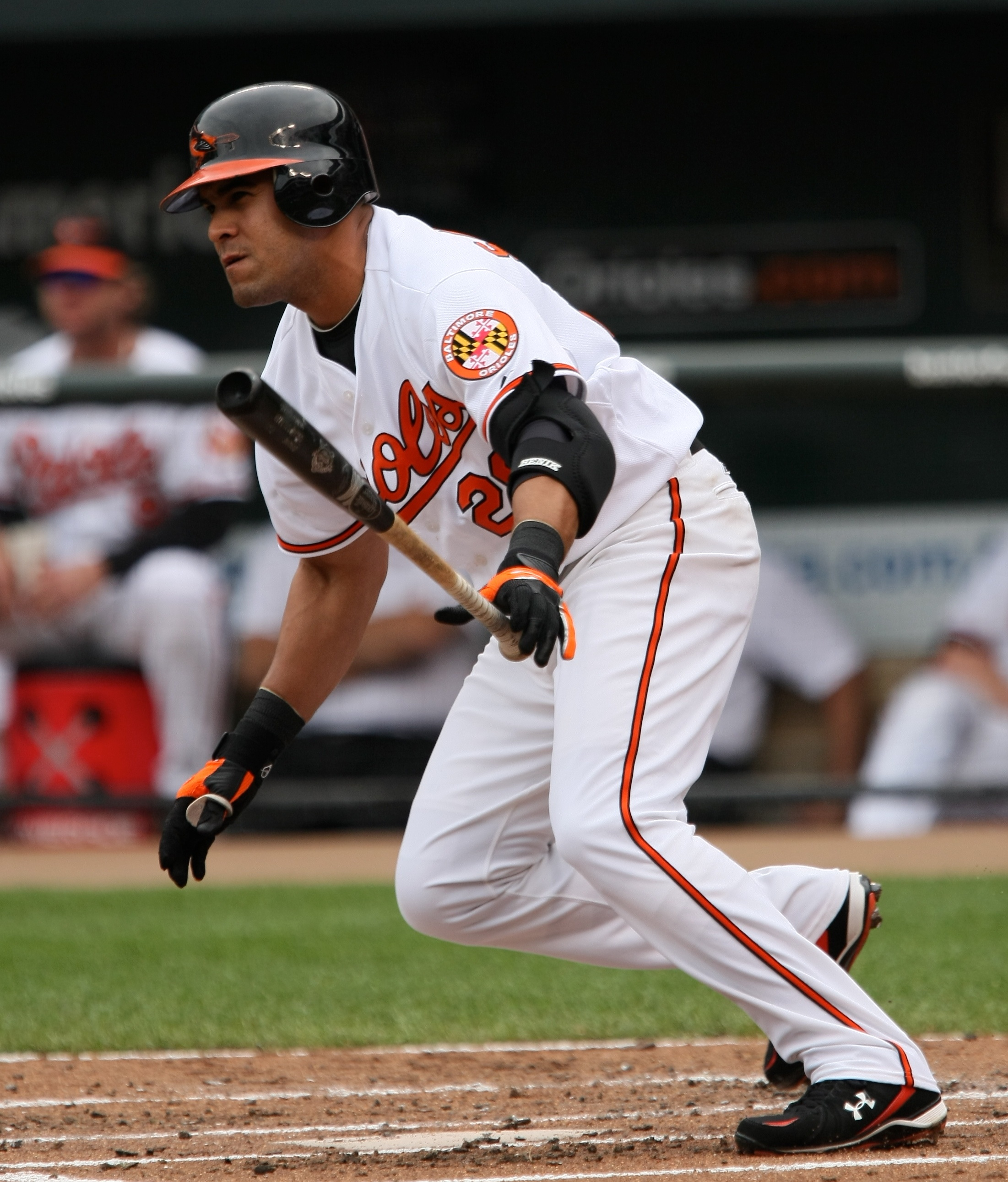
- Salazar with the Baltimore Orioles
- Infielder
- Born: June 27, 1978 (age 48); Maracay, Venezuela
- Batted: Right Threw: Right

Professional debut
- MLB: April 10, 2002, for the Detroit Tigers
- NPB: April 13, 2012, for the Yokohama DeNA BayStars

Last appearance
- MLB: October 2, 2010, for the San Diego Padres
- NPB: May 1, 2012, for the Yokohama DeNA BayStars

MLB statistics
- Batting average: .269
- Home runs: 14
- Runs batted in: 62

NPB statistics
- Batting average: .222
- Home runs: 0
- Runs batted in: 1
- Stats at Baseball Reference

Teams
- As player: Detroit Tigers (2002); Baltimore Orioles (2008–2009); San Diego Padres (2009–2010); Yokohama DeNA BayStars (2012)

Oscar Enrique Salazar (born June 27, 1978) is a Venezuelan former Major League Baseball (MLB) infielder. He previously played in Major League Baseball for the Detroit Tigers, Baltimore Orioles and San Diego Padres. He also played in Nippon Professional Baseball for the Yokohama DeNA BayStars.

== Playing career ==
Signed by Oakland as an amateur free agent in 1994, Salazar was selected off waivers by the Detroit Tigers in 2002, and made his major league debut for the Tigers on April 10, 2002 against the Chicago White Sox. He appeared a pinch runner in the seventh inning and remained in the game at second base during the Tigers' 7–5 loss.

In one season as a backup with the Tigers, Salazar batted .190 with one home run and three RBI in eight games.

In 2003, Salazar was diagnosed with injuries in his arm and shoulder which required season-ending surgery. He worked out in 2004 spring training, but his recovery was slower than expected. He played that season for the Akron Aeros, the Cleveland Indians' Double-A affiliate, batting .221 with six home runs and 21 RBI in 44 games.

In 2005, Salazar played for Cancún of the Mexican League, appearing in 71 games and batting .273 with six home runs and 32 RBI. He played for his hometown team, the Tigres de Aragua the Caribbean Series, after he plays on his actual team, Tiburones de La Guaira.

=== Baltimore Orioles ===
On November 24, 2006, Salazar signed with the Baltimore Orioles as a minor league free agent. He played for the Bowie Baysox of the Double-A Eastern League in 2007. In 136 games with the Baysox, he hit .290 with 22 home runs and 96 RBI. He began 2008 with the Triple-A Norfolk Tides of the International League, batting .311 with seven home runs, 23 doubles and 44 RBI in 63 games before his June recall.

On June 10, 2008, Salazar was called up to the Orioles to replace struggling starter Steve Trachsel on the roster. He batted .284 with five home runs and 15 RBI in 34 games with the Orioles in 2008.

=== San Diego Padres ===
On July 19, 2009, Salazar was traded to the San Diego Padres for relief pitcher Cla Meredith. On February 1, 2011, the Padres designated Salazar for assignment. He was released by the Padres on March 28, 2011.

=== Florida Marlins ===
On April 14, 2011, Salazar signed a minor league contract with the Florida Marlins. He spent the season with the Triple-A New Orleans Zephyrs, batting .221 with two home runs and 16 RBI in 45 games.

=== Yokohama DeNA BayStars ===
On February 12, 2012, Salazar passed a try out for a Japanese team, Yokohama DeNA BayStars and signed a contract. In 66 games with Yokohama, Salazar hit .265 with seven home runs and 32 RBI. He was released by the BayStars on October 16, 2012.

=== Guerreros de Oaxaca ===
On March 23, 2013, Salazar signed with the Guerreros de Oaxaca of the Mexican Baseball League. In 18 games he hit .303/.407/.439 with 2 home runs, 13 RBIs and 1 stolen base.

=== Pericos de Puebla ===
On April 14, 2013, Salazar was traded to the Pericos de Puebla. He was released on April 24, 2013. In 9 games he hit .250/.324/.406 with 1 home run and 7 RBIs.

=== Rimini Baseball Club ===
In 2014, Salazar signed with the Rimini Baseball Club of the Serie A1 Italian Baseball League. In 42 games he hit .262/.400/.443 with 6 home runs, 26 RBIs and 2 stolen bases.

== Coaching career ==
=== San Diego Padres organization ===
On March 30, 2021, Salazar was named fielding coach for the El Paso Chihuahuas.

=== Washington Nationals organization ===
Salazar was named as a development coach for the Washington Nationals Doubhle-A affiliate Harrisburg Senators for the 2024 season.

== See also ==
- List of Major League Baseball players from Venezuela
