= Tony Batista =

Dominican baseball player (born 1973)

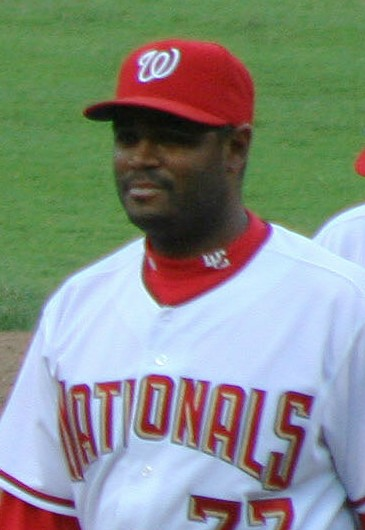
- Third baseman / Shortstop
- Born: December 9, 1973 (age 52); Puerto Plata, Dominican Republic
- Batted: Right Threw: Right

MLB debut
- June 3, 1996, for the Oakland Athletics

Last MLB appearance
- September 30, 2007, for the Washington Nationals

MLB statistics
- Batting average: .251
- Home runs: 221
- Runs batted in: 718
- Stats at Baseball Reference

Teams
- Oakland Athletics (1996–1997); Arizona Diamondbacks (1998–1999); Toronto Blue Jays (1999–2001); Baltimore Orioles (2001–2003); Montreal Expos (2004); Fukuoka SoftBank Hawks (2005); Minnesota Twins (2006); Washington Nationals (2007)

Career highlights and awards
- 2× All-Star (2000, 2002)

Leocadio Francisco "Tony" Batista Hernandez (born December 9, 1973) is a Dominican former Major League Baseball infielder. He played in the major leagues from 1996 to 2004 and 2006 to 2007, and with the SoftBank Hawks of the Japanese Pacific League in 2005.

== Career ==
His major league career began in 1996. He played for the Oakland A's, the Arizona Diamondbacks, the Toronto Blue Jays, the Baltimore Orioles, and the Montreal Expos, before moving on to Japan for the 2005 season. After returning from Japan he played for the Minnesota Twins and then the Washington Nationals, playing at first base, second base, shortstop, third base and designated hitter.

Batista was notable for his unusual, extremely open batting stance in which he would stand almost directly facing the pitcher during the delivery before stepping in to swing. He had good power, hitting 221 home runs, but had only a .251 batting average and seldom walked, with a .298 OBP.

He was elected to the American League All-Star team twice in (2000 and 2002).

=== Blue Jays years (1999–2001) ===
Tony Batista was acquired by the Toronto Blue Jays when they learned that their starting shortstop Alex Gonzalez, would be lost to them for the season in June of 1999. Batista was a solid player for the Jays, being voted to the 2000 American League All-Star Team and after two good seasons, was put on waivers in 2001 only to be immediately picked up by the Baltimore Orioles who were looking for someone to fill the legendary shoes of Cal Ripken, who was retiring at the end of that season.

=== Baltimore Orioles (2001–2003) ===
Batista played for the Orioles for 72 games in 2001 and the entire 2002 and 2003 seasons, being named an All-Star in 2002 and posting many season career highs. One of Batista's greatest moments as an Oriole was Opening Day 2002, the first post-Cal Ripken game. Batista hit a grand slam off Roger Clemens in a 10–3 win over the New York Yankees.

=== Montreal Expos (2004) ===
Batista played for the Expos in 157 games in the 2004 season. In the team's final year in Montreal, Batista was tied for first on the team in home runs with Brad Wilkerson, hitting 32 of them. Despite his .241 batting average, Batista was a fan favorite for his power.

=== 2005 season ===
After the 2004 season, he signed a two-year, $14 million contract with the Fukuoka SoftBank Hawks of Japan. In 2005, he batted .263, with 27 home runs and 90 RBI

On December 15, 2005, Batista signed a one-year contract with the Minnesota Twins, worth $1.25 million if he made the team out of spring training. On June 13, 2006, the Twins designated him for assignment, ending his tenure with the team. He was replaced at third by Nick Punto.

=== Washington Nationals (2007) ===
On February 14, 2007, he signed a minor-league deal with the Washington Nationals. He joined the Nationals' major-league roster on May 8, 2007. He started a few games at first base, and was used mainly as a pinch-hitter. On December 17, 2007, the Nationals outrighted him to the minor leagues, and on March 10, 2008, Batista signed a minor league contract with the Nationals, but was released in early May.

== See also ==
- List of Major League Baseball career home run leaders
