= Rosman García =

Venezuelan baseball player (1979-2011)

Rosman José García Parra
- Pitcher
- Born: January 3, 1979; Maracay, Venezuela
- Died: December 29, 2011 (aged 32); Aragua, Venezuela
- Batted: Right Threw: Right

MLB debut
- April 19, 2003, for the Texas Rangers

Last MLB appearance
- August 8, 2004, for the Texas Rangers

MLB statistics
- Win–loss record: 1–2
- Earned run average: 5.94
- Strikeouts: 30
- Stats at Baseball Reference

Teams
- Texas Rangers (2003–2004)

Rosman José García (January 3, 1979 – December 29, 2011) was a Venezuelan professional baseball relief pitcher who played in Major League Baseball (MLB) from 2003 through 2004 for the Texas Rangers. Listed at 6' 2", 215 lb., he batted and threw right handed.

== Career ==
In part of two seasons, García posted a 1–2 record with 30 strikeouts and a 5.94 ERA in 53 innings pitched.

On June 16, 1999, García became the first starting pitcher in Staten Island Yankees history. In 2008, he pitched for the Mexico City Red Devils of the Mexican League. In 14 starts, he was 4–5 with a 5.15 ERA and 44 strikeouts.

Originally, García debuted at age 18 with the Tigres de Aragua of the Venezuelan Professional Baseball League during the 1997–1998 season. In 2011–12, he became the pitcher to play the most consecutive seasons for the Tigres, with 14.

== Death ==
García died in a car accident in 2011 in the km 24 of the Autopista Regional del Centro located in the Miranda State, five days short of his 33rd birthday.

== See also ==
- List of Major League Baseball players from Venezuela
