= Gigantes de Carolina (baseball) =

Baseball team and Minor League Baseball franchise in Carolina, Puerto Rico

Logo	Cap insignia

Information
- League: Roberto Clemente Professional Baseball League
- Location: Carolina barrio-pueblo, Carolina, Puerto Rico
- Ballpark: Roberto Clemente Stadium
- Founded: 2000
- League championships: 2 (2005/2006 · 2006/2007)
- Colors: Black, gold and white
- President: Gigantes
- General manager: Gil Martínez
- Manager: Jesús Feliciano

Gigantes de Carolina (English: Carolina Giants) are a baseball team in the Puerto Rican Professional Baseball League (LBPPR). Based in the city of Carolina, Puerto Rico, the Gigantes play at Roberto Clemente Stadium. There is now an affiliated football club, Gigantes de Carolina, also playing out of the Roberto Clemente Stadium.

== Puerto Rico Baseball League ==
On November 18, 2009, the Gigantes defeated the Criollos. After defeating the Indios, the Gigantes gained the league's lead for a brief period of time. On November 20, 2009, the team defeated the Leones, scoring 17 hits. In their next game, the Leones defeated Carolina. On November 29, 2009, the team lost to the Gigantes del Cibao in inter-league action. On December 1, 2009, the Criollos defeated the Gigantes to win their first home game of the season.
