= Roberto Rodríguez (baseball) =

Venezuelan baseball player (1941–2012)

- Pitcher
- Born: February 5, 1941; Caracas, Venezuela
- Died: September 24, 2012 (aged 71); Maracay, Venezuela
- Batted: Right Threw: Right

MLB debut
- May 13, 1967, for the Kansas City Athletics

Last MLB appearance
- September 26, 1970, for the Chicago Cubs

MLB statistics
- Win–loss record: 4–3
- Earned run average: 4.81
- Strikeouts: 91
- Stats at Baseball Reference

Teams
- Kansas City / Oakland Athletics (1967, 1970); San Diego Padres (1970); Chicago Cubs (1970)

Member of the Venezuelan

Baseball Hall of Fame
- Induction: 2011

Roberto Muñoz Rodríguez (February 5, 1941 – September 24, 2012) was a Venezuelan professional baseball pitcher. He played in Major League Baseball (MLB) for the Kansas City / Oakland Athletics, San Diego Padres, and Chicago Cubs. He played in the United States under the name of Roberto Rodriguez.

== Career ==
Born in Caracas, Rodríguez carried a varied repertoire that relied on intelligence over raw explosiveness. He had a variable-speed fastball (reaching 90 MPH), a slider, a tough curveball, and a circle change-up as his most effective offering.

Once considered one of the best prospects in the Kansas City Athletics minor league system, he also pitched for the San Diego Padres and Chicago Cubs organizations.

Rodríguez was signed by the Athletics as an amateur free agent in 1963, spending seven minor league seasons from 1964–1970. He posted a 42–28 record and a 3.15 earned run average in 124 pitching appearances before being promoted to the big team in May 1967. He returned to the minors in early June and was recalled two months later.

He went 1–1 with a 3.57 ERA and two saves in 15 games (five starts). On August 27, he earned his first and only major league victory against the Detroit Tigers, 2–1, allowing four hits to a powerful lineup that included Norm Cash, Bill Freehan, Al Kaline, Dick McAuliffe, Eddie Mathews and Jim Northrup.

After that, Rodríguez would remain in the organization after the team was renamed the Oakland Athletics in 1968. He returned to the majors in 1970, pitching for the Athletics, Padres and Cubs in the same season. He later played three Triple-A seasons with the Tacoma Cubs and the Wichita Aeros from 1971 through 1974.

In a three-season career, he compiled a 4–3 record with a 4.81 ERA and seven saves in 57 games. Over the course of his 11-year minor league career from 1964–1974, he went 61–43 with a 3.60 ERA in 904 games.

In addition, Rodríguez played in the Venezuelan Professional Baseball League during 17 seasons (1961–62/1978–79). ″Pluto″, as his teammates nicknamed him, went 64–49 with a 3.04 ERA and 59 saves in 168 games (97 starts), to become the first pitcher in VPBL history to top both 50 wins and 50 saves. The mark was later matched by Luis Aponte (1973–74/1996–97) and Giovanni Carrara (1990–91/2009–10).

After retiring he worked as a pitching coach in his Venezuelan homeland. He also served as an instructor in the baseball academy operated by Carlos Guillén in Maracay. In 2011, he gained induction into the Venezuelan Baseball Hall of Fame.

Rodríguez died in Maracay in 2012, at the age of 71, after suffering a heart failure.

== See also ==
- List of players from Venezuela in Major League Baseball
