= Armando Ríos =

Puerto Rican baseball player (born 1971)

- Outfielder
- Born: September 13, 1971 (age 55); Santurce, Puerto Rico
- Batted: Left Threw: Left

MLB debut
- September 1, 1998, for the San Francisco Giants

Last MLB appearance
- September 27, 2003, for the Chicago White Sox

MLB statistics
- Batting average: .269
- Home runs: 36
- Runs batted in: 167
- Stats at Baseball Reference

Teams
- San Francisco Giants (1998–2001); Pittsburgh Pirates (2001–2002); Chicago White Sox (2003)

Member of the Caribbean

Baseball Hall of Fame
- Induction: 2020
Medals
Men's baseball
Representing Puerto Rico
Pan American Games
| Silver medal – second place | 1991 Havana | Team |

Armando Ríos (born September 13, 1971) is a Puerto Rican professional baseball outfielder who played in Major League Baseball from 1998 through 2003. He batted and threw left-handed.

== Career ==
Rios played center field for Louisiana State University from 1991 to 1993.

Armando Ríos first reached the majors in 1998 with the San Francisco Giants, spending part of four seasons with them before moving to the Pittsburgh Pirates (2001–02) and Chicago White Sox (2003). His most productive season came in 2001, when he hit .260 in 95 games and posted career-highs in home runs (14), RBI (50), runs (38), hits (83) and doubles (17).

Since his last MLB season, Rios has played in the Pacific, International, and Atlantic leagues.

In 2006, Ríos played with the Algodoneros de Guasave in the Mexican Pacific League. In 2008, Ríos played for the Tigres del Licey in the Dominican Winter Baseball League. Currently, Ríos is playing baseball in Carolina, Puerto Rico.

Ríos is an admitted user of performance-enhancing drugs, testifying in the BALCO case after surgeries on his knee, elbow, and shoulder. He is one of the players mentioned in the 2007 Mitchell Report.

== See also ==
- List of Major League Baseball players from Puerto Rico
- List of Major League Baseball players named in the Mitchell Report
