= 2009 Caribbean Series =

2009 baseball tournament

The fifty-first edition of the Caribbean Series (Serie del Caribe) was played in 2009. It was held from February 2 through February 7 with the champions teams from Dominican Republic (Tigres del Licey), Mexico (Venados de Mazatlán), Puerto Rico (Leones de Ponce) and Venezuela (Tigres de Aragua). The format consisted of 12 games, each team facing the other teams twice. The games were played at Estadio Casas GEO in Mexicali, Baja California, Mexico.

== Summary ==
Tigres de Aragua of Venezuela clinched its first team Caribbean Series title and seventh as a country with a 5–1 record. Guided by Buddy Bailey, the Venezuelan club took the top spot much more easily than expected, especially considering the absence of big-name stars, which was mitigated by playing small ball. In addition, the opportune hitting and sharp defense were bolstered by above-average running speed and strong bullpen support. Venezuela clinched the title with a 5–3 win over host Mexico before an overflow crowd at Mexicali's stadium. Closer Francisco Buttó set records with more saves in a series (4) and most saves in series history (6, including 2007 and 2008 editions), which was enough to be named the Most Valuable Player of the series. Also providing offensive support were SS Luis Maza (.300 batting average), CF Selwin Langaigne (.280, three runs, three RBI) and 2B Ramón Castro (.286 BA, four RBI). The team only committed three errors and the pitching staff posted a collective 2.41 earned run average. Venezuela blasted only one home run in the series, but it was a good one as first baseman Héctor Giménez' 11th-inning, walk-off solo homer in Game 4 pushed the Tigers to a 1–0 victory over the Mexican team. The only winning starter on their staff was Horacio Estrada (one earned run, three strikeouts in 5 1/3 innings of work). Other members of the team included starter Tim Harikkala (0.00 ERA in six innings) and relievers Ronald Belisario, Iván Blanco, Marcos Carvajal, Andrew Lorraine and Víctor Moreno; catching tandem of Alex Delgado and Wilson Ramos; DH Raúl Chávez; 3B Luis Ugueto, and outfielders Rodney Medina and Jackson Melián.

The experienced Lorenzo Bundy managed the Mexican club, represented by the Venados de Mazatlán, and finished in second place with a modest 3–3 mark. A strong offense and solid defense (only three errors) were not enough to compensate for poor pitching and a lack of speed on the basepaths. Leading the offensive charge were Edgar Gonzalez, who had the series' highest batting average at .423 (.454 OBP, .577 SLG), though his brother Adrián González did hit .286 with eight RBI and a .714 SLG, including three home runs in a game to set a series record. SS Héber Gómez (.368 BA, .474 SLG, five runs, three RBI) and RF Christian Quintero (.318 BA, three runs, three RBI) also carried much of the offensive weight. One of the few bright spots in the pitching staff was Walter Silva, who posted a 1–1 record with 12 strikeouts and a 2.25 ERA in two starts. The roster also included veteran pitchers Francisco Córdova and Pablo Ortega; catcher Miguel Ojeda; outfielder Rubén Rivera, and infielders Freddy Sandoval, Robert Saucedo and Óscar Robles.

The Dominican Republic and Puerto Rico finished tied in third place with a 2–4 record.

The defending champion Tigres del Licey, of the Dominican Republic, was a pale shadow of the glorious franchise that won 10 series titles (three undefeated) and posted a 65–24 record (.730 percentage) in 15 appearances between 1971 and 2008. Managed by José Offerman, the offense mustered little punch (.220 BA) and led the series with seven errors. The most prominent players were starters Alfredo Simón (1–0, five hits, seven SO in 7.0 innings) and Ramón Ortiz (1.42 ERA, five SO, 6 1/3 innings); reliever Julio Mañón (two saves), and DH Ronny Paulino (.381 BA, .762 SLG, five RBI). Also in the roster were pitchers Wilton Chávez, Valerio de los Santos, Julio Mateo, José Mercedes, Jailen Peguero, Carlos Pérez, Oneli Pérez and Jorge Sosa; catcher Salvador Paniagua; infielders Erick Aybar, Willy Aybar, Ronnie Belliard, Anderson Hernández and D'Angelo Jiménez, and outfielders José Bautista, Fernando Martínez, Ricardo Nanita and Timo Pérez.

Puerto Rico returned to the Series after a one-year absence, represented by the Leones de Ponce and managed by Eduardo Pérez, former big leaguer and ESPN Baseball Tonight broadcaster. The Boricuas team outscored their rivals, 18–16, despite a negative record of 2–4. The pitching staff was led by Giancarlo Alvarado (1–0, 16 SO and a 2.32 ERA in 11 2/3 innings), and posted one of the two shutouts in the series, while the offense was paced by SS Luis Figueroa (.389 BA, 4 RBI), 1B Carlos Rivera (.360 BA, 4 RBI) and 2B Andy González (.333 BA, 4 RBI). The rest of the roster was filled with starters Josué Matos (1–0, 5.0 innings), Héctor Mercado (1.29 ERA, seven SO, 6 2/3 innings) and Bill Pulsipher (1.42 ERA, seven SO, 6 1/3 innings); relievers Iván Maldonado (one save, 4 SO, 3 2/3 innings), Josh Rainwater (0.00 ERA, 5.0 innings) and Fernando Cabrera; catchers Eli Marrero, Robinson Cancel and Raúl Casanova; infielders Fernando Cortez and Iggy Suarez, and outfielders Jesús Feliciano and Raúl González, among others. To fill the void last winter, Perez, who took over as Ponce's manager just one day before the start of the regular season, created the Winter Training Program for professional and amateur players on the island, and expressed cautious optimism that winter baseball in Puerto Rico was back to stay.

== Final standings ==
Country	Club	W	L	W/L %	GB	Managers
Venezuela	Tigres de Aragua	5	1	.833	–	Buddy Bailey
Mexico	Venados de Mazatlán	3	3	.500	2.0	Lorenzo Bundy
Dominican Republic	Tigres de Licey	2	4	.333	3.0	José Offerman
Puerto Rico	Leones de Ponce	2	4	.333	3.0	Eduardo Pérez

Individual leaders
Player	Statistic
Edgar Gonzalez (MEX)	Batting average	.423
Adrián González (MEX)	Home runs	3
Adrián González (MEX)	RBI	8
Héber Gómez / (MEX)	Runs	7
Edgar Gonzalez (MEX)	Hits	11
Luis Maza (VEN)	Doubles	3
Edgar Gonzalez (MEX)	Triples	1
Anderson Hernández (DOM); Luis Ugueto (VEN)	Stolen bases	2
Edgar Gonzalez (MEX)	OBP	.469
Adrián González (MEX)	SLG	.714
Adrián González (MEX)	OPS	1.114
Twelve tied	Wins	1
Giancarlo Alvarado (PRI)	Strikeouts	16
Walter Silva (MEX)	ERA	2.25
Walter Silva (MEX)	Innings pitched	12.0
Francisco Buttó (VEN)	Saves	4
Francisco Buttó (VEN)	Games pitched	4
Awards
Francisco Buttó (VEN)	Most Valuable Player
Buddy Bailey (VEN)	Manager

All-Star Team
Name	Position
Wilson Ramos (VEN)	catcher
Adrián González (MEX)	first baseman
Edgar Gonzalez (MEX)	second baseman
Luis Maza (VEN)	third baseman
Luis Figueroa (PRI)	shortstop
Rodney Medina (VEN)	left fielder
Selwyn Langaigne (VEN)	center fielder
Christian Quintero (MEX)	right fielder
Ronny Paulino (DOM)	designated hitter
Giancarlo Alvarado (PRI)	RH pitcher
Horacio Estrada (VEN)	LH pitcher
Francisco Buttó (VEN)	relief pitcher
Buddy Bailey (VEN)	manager

== Scoreboards ==
=== Game 1, February 2 ===
Team	1	2	3	4	5	6	7	8	9	R	H	E
Venezuela	0	1	0	0	0	0	1	0	1	3	9	2
Dominican Republic	0	0	0	0	0	0	2	0	0	2	3	1
WP: Ronald Belisario (1-0) LP: Victor Marte (0-1) Sv: Francisco Buttó (1); Home runs: VEN: None; DOM: Ronnie Belliard (1); Notes: Venezuela's Brad Knox pitched hitless ball into the seventh inning.

=== Game 2, February 2 ===
Team	1	2	3	4	5	6	7	8	9	R	H	E
Puerto Rico	0	1	0	0	1	0	0	0	0	2	4	1
Mexico	1	0	0	0	0	1	1	0	X	3	8	1
WP: Walter Silva (1-0) LP: Bubbie Buzachero (0-1) Sv: Héctor Navarro (1); Notes: Starters Silva (11) and Giancarlo Alvarado (11) and four relievers (5) combined to set a Series game record for most strikeouts (27).

=== Game 3, February 3 ===
Team	1	2	3	4	5	6	7	8	9	R	H	E
Dominican Republic	0	0	0	0	0	0	2	0	0	2	4	0
Puerto Rico	0	0	0	1	0	0	0	0	0	1	6	1
WP: Alfredo Simón (1-0) LP: José Vaquedano (0-1) Sv: Julio Mañón (1); Home runs: DOM: Fernando Martínez (1); PUR: None

=== Game 4, February 3 ===
Team	1	2	3	4	5	6	7	8	9	10	11	R	H	E
Mexico	0	0	0	0	0	0	0	0	0	0	0	0	8	1
Venezuela	0	0	0	0	0	0	0	0	0	0	1	1	6	0
WP: Marcos Carvajal (1-0) LP: José Cobos (0-1); Home runs: MEX: None; VEN: Héctor Giménez (1)

=== Game 5, February 4 ===
Team	1	2	3	4	5	6	7	8	9	R	H	E
Venezuela	0	2	0	2	0	1	0	0	0	5	8	0
Puerto Rico	0	0	1	0	0	0	1	0	0	2	7	3
WP: Horacio Estrada (1-0) LP: Orlando Román (0-1) Sv: Francisco Buttó (2)

=== Game 6, February 4 ===
Team	1	2	3	4	5	6	7	8	9	R	H	E
Mexico	0	2	1	3	2	3	0	0	1	12	16	1
Dominican Republic	1	0	4	1	0	0	0	3	0	9	11	5
WP: Rafael Martin (1-0) LP: Jorge Sosa (0-1) Sv: Héctor Navarro (2); Home runs: MEX: Adrián González 3 (3); DOM: José Bautista (1); Notes: With his three homers, González set a Series record for most HRs in a single game.

=== Game 7, February 5 ===
Team	1	2	3	4	5	6	7	8	9	R	H	E
Dominican Republic	2	0	0	0	0	0	0	0	0	2	6	0
Venezuela	0	0	3	0	0	0	0	0	X	3	9	0
WP: Iván Blanco (1-0) LP: Nerio Rodríguez (0-1) Sv: Francisco Buttó (3); Home runs: DOM: Ronny Paulino (1); VEN: None

=== Game 8, February 5 ===
Team	1	2	3	4	5	6	7	8	9	10	11	12	R	H	E
Mexico	0	0	0	0	1	0	0	0	0	0	0	4	5	10	0
Puerto Rico	0	0	1	0	0	0	0	0	0	0	0	0	1	12	2
WP: José Luis García (1-0) LP: Travis Minix (0-1)

=== Game 9, February 6 ===
Team	1	2	3	4	5	6	7	8	9	R	H	E
Puerto Rico	1	0	1	0	0	1	0	0	0	3	9	0
Dominican Republic	0	0	0	0	0	0	0	0	0	0	5	0
WP: Josué Matos (1-0) LP: Julio Mateo (0-1) Sv: Iván Maldonado (1); Home runs: PRI: Jesús Feliciano (1), Andy González (1); DOM: None

=== Game 10, February 6 ===
Team	1	2	3	4	5	6	7	8	9	R	H	E
Venezuela	0	2	0	0	0	0	3	0	0	5	12	1
Mexico	1	0	0	0	1	0	0	0	1	3	7	0
WP: Orber Moreno (1-0) LP: Oscar Bustillos (0-1) Sv: Francisco Buttó (4); Notes: * Tigres de Aragua of Venezuela clinched its first team Series title and seventh as a country. * Buttó set records for the most saves in a Series (4) and in Series history (6, including 2007–2008 editions).

=== Game 11, February 7 ===
Team	1	2	3	4	5	6	7	8	9	R	H	E
Puerto Rico	0	0	9	0	0	0	0	0	0	9	14	1
Venezuela	0	0	0	1	0	0	0	0	0	1	4	0
WP: Giancarlo Alvarado (1-0) LP: Brad Knox (0-1); Home runs: PRI: Jorge Padilla (1); VEN: None

=== Game 12, February 7 ===
Team	1	2	3	4	5	6	7	8	9	R	H	E
Dominican Republic	2	0	0	0	2	0	0	0	0	4	8	1
Mexico	0	0	1	0	1	0	0	0	0	2	8	1
WP: Oneli Pérez (1-0) LP: Walter Silva (1-1) Sv: Julio Mañón (2); Home runs: DOM: Ronny Paulino (2), Salvador Paniagua (1); MEX: None

== Television ==
- MLB Network televised the 51st annual event, marking the first live games telecast on the baseball specialty channel. José Mota and Tom McCarthy were the English play-by-play announcers, while Cookie Rojas and Uri Berenguer were the color commentators based in the network's studios in Secaucus, New Jersey. When McCarthy took another assignment for a few days, Dan Plesac filled in on color as Berenguer took over play-by-play.

== See also ==
- Ballplayers who have appeared in the Series

== Sources ==
- Antero Núñez, José. Series del Caribe. Impresos Urbina, Caracas, Venezuela.
- Araujo Bojórquez, Alfonso. Series del Caribe: Narraciones y estadísticas, 1949-2001. Colegio de Bachilleres del Estado de Sinaloa, Mexico.
- Figueredo, Jorge S. Cuban Baseball: A Statistical History, 1878 - 1961. Macfarland & Co., United States.
- González Echevarría, Roberto. The Pride of Havana. Oxford University Express.
- Gutiérrez, Daniel. Enciclopedia del Béisbol en Venezuela, Caracas, Venezuela.
