= 2006 Caribbean Series =

2006 baseball tournament

The forty-eighth edition of the Caribbean Series (Serie del Caribe) baseball tournament was played in 2006 in the neighboring cities of Maracay and Valencia in Venezuela, making it the first one to be played in two cities. It was held from February 2 through February 7 featuring the champion teams from The Dominican Republic (Licey), Mexico (Mazatlán), Puerto Rico (Carolina) and Venezuela (Caracas). The format consisted of 12 games, each team facing the other teams twice. The games were played at Estadio José Pérez Colmenares (Maracay) and Estadio José Bernardo Pérez (Valencia).

== Summary ==
The Venezuela home team, represented by the Leones del Caracas, won its first Caribbean Series title since 1989 after a dramatic rally with one out in the bottom of the ninth inning led them to a perfect 6-0 finish, the 9th time this had happened in the Series.

Managed by Carlos Subero, Venezuela outscored their opponents 45–15 while the defense committed only three errors. Triple Crown winner Ramón Hernández was named the Series Most Valuable Player after leading all players with a .542 batting average (13-for-24) and eight RBIs, while tying with Edgar González with three home runs. Hernández also hit for the cycle in Game Two, to become the first player to do it in the Series history.

Other notable contributions came from Alex Cabrera (.360, 2 HR, 7 RBIs), Álex González (.409, 1 HR, 7 RBIs), Marco Scutaro (.304, 7 runs, 5 RBIs, 2 HR, including a grand slam), Luis Rodríguez (.310, 3 doubles, 5 runs, 8 RBIs) and Franklin Gutiérrez (.364, 4 runs, 4 RBIs). Overall, the Venezuelan club hit .327 with nine home runs. The pitching staff posted a collective 2.62 earned run average and was led by Geremi González, who went 1-0 and topped all pitchers in ERA (1.20) and innings pitched (15), striking out 12 batters while walking just three.

In addition, Subero, at 33, became the youngest manager to win a Caribbean Series championship. Manny Acta was 34 when he guided the Dominicans to the title in 2004.

The Dominican Republic finished the series in second place with a 4–2 record. Both losses were to Venezuela. The team was managed by Rafael Landestoy and included players as Alexis Gómez, who led his teammates with a .500 BA (10-for-20), and Miguel Tejada (.273, 1 HR, 8 RBIs), Sandy Martínez (.300, 1 HR, 5 RBIs), Napoleón Calzado (.321) and Rafael Belliard (.304, 1 HR).

Puerto Rico was guided by Lino Rivera and finished third at 2–4, both its wins coming against Mexico. Other than starter Willie Collazo (0–1) and relievers Iván Maldonado and Orlando Román, the pitching staff was ineffective. The offense was led by Luis Figueroa (.364, 1 HR, 5 RBIs), Rubén Gotay (.368, 1 HR), Alex Cintrón (.308, 1 HR) and José Valentín (.269, 1 HR).

The defending champion Mexico did not win a game in the series. Managed by Juan José Pacho, it was the fifth time a Mexican team had been held winless in Caribbean Series history. Edgar González led the attack with a .524 BA (11-for-21) and three solo home runs. The team also included veterans players such as Trenidad Hubbard, Oscar Robles and Francisco Campos.

== Final standings ==
Country	Club	W	L	W/L %	GB	Managers
Venezuela	Leones del Caracas	6	0	1.000	–	Carlos Subero
Dominican Republic	Tigres del Licey	4	2	.667	2.0	Rafael Landestoy
Puerto Rico	Gigantes de Carolina	2	4	.333	4.0	Lino Rivera
Mexico	Venados de Mazatlán	0	6	.000	6.0	Juan José Pacho

Individual leaders
Player/Club	Statistic
Ramón Hernández/VEN	Batting average	.542
Edgar González/MEX; Ramón Hernández/VEN	Home runs	3
Ramón Hernández/VEN	Runs batted in	9
Marco Scutaro/VEN	Runs	7
Ramón Hernández/VEN	Hits	13
Ramón Hernández/VEN; Luis Rodríguez/VEN	Doubles	3
Five tied	Triples	1
Manny Aybar/DOM	Stolen bases	2
Twelve tied	Wins	1
Geremi González/VEN	Strikeouts	12
Geremi González/VEN	Earned run average	1.20
Geremi González/VEN	Innings pitched	15
Jorge Sosa/DOM	Saves	2
Awards
Ramón Hernández/VEN	Most Valuable Player
Carlos Subero/VEN	Manager

All-Star Team
Name/Club	Position
Sandy Martínez/DOM	catcher
Ramón Hernández/VEN	first baseman
Edgar González/MEX	second baseman
Luis Rodríguez/VEN	third baseman
Álex González/VEN	shortstop
Napoleón Calzado/DOM	left fielder
Alexis Gómez/DOM	center fielder
Timo Pérez/DOM	right fielder
Alex Cabrera/VEN	designated hitter
Geremi González/VEN	right-handed pitcher
Willie Collazo/PUR	left-handed pitcher
Carlos Subero/VEN	manager

=== Scoreboards ===
==== Game 1, February 2 at Maracay ====
Team	1	2	3	4	5	6	7	8	9	10	11	R	H	E
Dominican Republic	0	0	2	0	0	1	1	0	0	0	1	5	11	1
Puerto Rico	0	0	3	0	0	0	0	1	0	0	0	4	12	1
WP: Eddie Ramos (1-0) LP: Federico Báez (0-1) Sv: Román Colón (1); Home runs: DOM: Pedro Valdez (1); PUR: None

==== Game 2, February 2 at Valencia ====
Team	1	2	3	4	5	6	7	8	9	R	H	E
Venezuela	0	0	0	3	1	0	4	2	7	17	21	2
Mexico	0	0	0	0	0	1	0	0	0	1	4	1
WP: Geremi González (1-0) LP: Pablo Ortega (0-1); Home runs: VEN: Ramón Hernández (1), Alex Cabrera (1); MEX: None; Notes: Venezuela's Hernández became the first player to hit for the cycle in Series history.

==== Game 3, February 3 at Valencia ====
Team	1	2	3	4	5	6	7	8	9	R	H	E
Dominican Republic	0	0	0	6	0	0	2	0	2	10	11	2
Mexico	0	0	4	0	0	0	0	2	0	6	11	1
WP: Wilton Chávez (1-0) LP: Francisco Campos (0-1) Sv: Jorge Sosa (1); Home runs: DOM: Miguel Tejada (1); MEX: Edgar González (2)

==== Game 4, February 3 at Maracay ====
Team	1	2	3	4	5	6	7	8	9	R	H	E
Venezuela	0	6	0	0	0	0	0	0	0	6	11	0
Puerto Rico	0	0	0	1	0	0	0	0	0	1	10	1
WP: Orlando Trías (1-0) LP: Jim Magrane (0-1); Home runs: VEN: Marco Scutaro (1); PUR: None

==== Game 5, February 4 at Valencia ====
Team	1	2	3	4	5	6	7	8	9	R	H	E
Puerto Rico	0	4	1	1	1	0	2	0	1	10	14	2
Mexico	1	0	5	0	1	0	2	0	0	9	18	3
WP: Iván Maldonado (1-0) LP: José Luis García (0-1); Home runs: PUR: Luis Figueroa (1), Edwards Guzmán (1), Víctor Rodríguez (1); MEX: None

==== Game 6, February 4 at Valencia ====
Team	1	2	3	4	5	6	7	8	9	R	H	E
Venezuela	0	0	0	0	1	1	5	1	3	11	15	0
Dominican Republic	2	1	1	1	1	1	1	1	0	9	15	0
WP: Juan Ovalles (1-0) LP: Román Colón (0-1) Sv: Francisco Rodríguez (1); Home runs: VEN: Henry Blanco (1), Alex Cabrera (2), Álex González (1); DOM: None

==== Game 7, February 5 at Maracay ====
Team	1	2	3	4	5	6	7	8	9	R	H	E
Puerto Rico	0	0	0	0	0	2	0	0	0	2	6	2
Dominican Republic	0	2	0	1	0	0	6	0	x	9	9	1
WP: Danny Tamayo (1-0) LP: Josué Matos (0-1)

==== Game 8, February 5 at Maracay ====
Team	1	2	3	4	5	6	7	8	9	10	R	H	E
Mexico	0	1	0	0	0	0	0	0	2	0	3	6	0
Venezuela	0	0	0	1	1	1	0	0	0	1	4	9	0
WP: Mauro Zárate (1-0) LP: Ignacio Flores (0-1); Home runs: MEX: None; VEN: Ramón Hernández (2)

==== Game 9, February 6 at Maracay ====
Team	1	2	3	4	5	6	7	8	9	R	H	E
Dominican Republic	0	0	0	0	0	2	0	1	0	3	11	1
Mexico	0	0	0	0	1	0	0	0	0	1	3	1
WP: Daniel Cabrera (1-0) LP: Walter Silva (0-1) Sv: Jorge Sosa (2)

==== Game 10, February 6 at Valencia ====
Team	1	2	3	4	5	6	7	8	9	R	H	E
Puerto Rico	1	0	0	0	0	0	0	0	0	1	2	4
Venezuela	0	0	1	0	0	1	2	1	x	5	9	0
WP: Albert Vargas (1-0) LP: Willie Collazo (0-1); Home runs: PUR: Rubén Gotay (1); VEN: Rafael Álvarez (1)

==== Game 11, February 7 at Valencia ====
Team	1	2	3	4	5	6	7	8	9	10	11	R	H	E
Mexico	0	0	1	0	0	1	0	0	0	0	0	2	3	0
Puerto Rico	1	0	0	0	0	0	0	1	0	0	1	3	12	1
WP: Orlando Román (1-0) LP: José Luis García (0-2); Home runs: MEX: Trenidad Hubbard (1); PUR: José Valentín (1)

==== Game 12, February 7 at Maracay ====
Team	1	2	3	4	5	6	7	8	9	R	H	E
Dominican Republic	2	0	0	1	0	0	1	0	0	4	7	1
Venezuela	0	0	0	1	0	2	0	0	2	5	8	1
WP: Víctor Moreno (1-0) LP: Jorge Sosa (0-1); Home runs: DOM: Sandy Martínez (1); VEN: Ramón Hernández (3)

== Quotes ==
- "Up to the bag, hits a very high fly, comfortable, to short left field. Back in is the short (stop) Erick Aybar. The ball is coming down and hit Aybar in the head... THE BALL DROPS! THE BALL DROPS! VENEZUELA IS GOING TO WIN! VENEZUELA IS GOING TO WIN! VENEZUELA IS GOING TO WIN!...AND VENEZUELA HAS WON THE CARIBBEAN SERIES, 2006! (Translation of Fox Sports en Español narrator Beto Villa on the final play)

== See also ==
- Ballplayers who have played in the Series

== Sources ==
- Antero Núñez, José. Series del Caribe. Jefferson, Caracas, Venezuela: Impresos Urbina, C.A., 1987.
- Gutiérrez, Daniel. Enciclopedia del Béisbol en Venezuela – 1895-2006 . Caracas, Venezuela: Impresión Arte, C.A., 2007.
