= 2008 Caribbean Series =

2008 baseball tournament

The fiftieth edition of the Caribbean Series (Serie del Caribe) was played in 2008. It was held from February 2 through February 7, featuring the champions teams from Mexico, Yaquis de Obregón; Venezuela, Tigres de Aragua, and two teams from Dominican Republic: Águilas Cibaeñas [1] and Tigres del Licey [2]. The format consisted of 12 games, each team facing the other teams twice, and was played at Estadio Cibao, home of the Águilas. Licey finished second in the Dominican League, but made the Series due to the cancellation of the Puerto Rican League season due to financial problems. It was the first Series fully held in the city of Santiago de los Caballeros and the first round-robin of its kind to feature two teams from the Dominican Republic.

== Summary ==
Licey, managed by Héctor de la Cruz, finished with a 5–1 record to clinch the club's 10th Caribbean Series title since the country began participating in 1970 and the 17th overall for the Dominican Republic. Pitcher and Series MVP Ramón Ortiz posted a 2–0 record with a 0.00 ERA in 11 2/3 scoreless IP against the Águilas, including five of relief. RF Nelson Cruz provided the offensive support for the team, leading the Series hitters in batting average (.407), hits (11), doubles (3), SLG (.630) and OPS (1,037). Licey also got fine work off starters José Capellán (1-0, 3.37 ERA) and Francisco Rosario (0.00, five SO in 6.0 IP), as well from relievers Jailen Peguero (1-0) and Carlos Mármol (two saves). Other contributions came from 3B/OF José Bautista (.250, two home runs, four RBI, six runs, two stolen bases, .440 SLG), 2B Ronnie Belliard (.273 BA, four RBI, .455 SLG), LF Emilio Bonifacio (.250, five runs, two SB) and C Matt Tupman, who batted .364 (8-for-23) and was the only of Licey's players with at least one hit in each game.

Managed by Félix Fermín, the Dominican champions wasted home field advantage, ending in second place with a 3–3 mark. The Cibao's team was characterized by an ineffective pitching staff and a poor offense, while the defense committed crucial errors. Two hitters carried much of the offensive weight – 2B Rafael Furcal (.400, 10 hits, five runs, four RBI, .560 SLG) and SS Tony Peña Jr. (.429 BA, .524 SLG), while DH Miguel Tejada provided a substantial (if discreet) contribution (.208, five runs, two HR, .318 SLG). Pitchers Joselo Díaz (1-0, eight strikeouts, 1.50 ERA in six IP) and Arnie Muñoz (1-0, one save, 0.00 in 1 2/3 IP) headed the staff. Supporting them were Randy Choate (0.00 ERA, 4.0 IP), Joel Peralta (0.00, 2.0 IP) and Francisco Cruceta (1.69, 5 1/3 IP), but Denny Bautista (1-0), Bartolo Colón (0-1), Sergio Ramírez and Alfredo Simón, combined for an 8.00 ERA in 18 innings.

Mexico was guided by Homar Rojas and finished with a 2–4 record, tying for third place with Venezuela. DH Robert Saucedo (.346, seven runs, six RBI, .577 SLG), SS Alfredo Amézaga (.381, five runs, three SB, .435 OBP) and OF Armando Ríos (.312, two SB, .375 SLG) paced the offense, while the top pitcher was Nelson Figueroa (1-0, 0.81, seven SO in 11.0 IP). The Obregón team also included players like Justin Lehr (P), Óscar Robles (2B), Dan Serafini (P) and Reggie Taylor (OF).

Venezuela, piloted by Buddy Bailey, played with a depleted line-up. This year, 15 players from the Venezuelan finals roster were unavailable for the Series, including Miguel Cabrera, Ronny Cedeño and Edgardo Alfonzo, due to Spring Training reports. Luis Maza, the man charged with filling Cabrera's shoes at third base, responded by hitting .348 (8-for-23) with six runs and a .435 SLG. Other help came from outfielders Selwyn Langaigne (.357, four RBI) and Alberto Callaspo (.346, four runs), as well from pitchers Giovanni Carrara (1-0, four hits, four SO, 0.00 ERA in 5.0 IP) and Ramón García (three hits, three SO, 0.00 ERA in 4.0 IP). The only homers were hit by sub-batters Alex Delgado (C, .100) and Luis Ugueto (OF, .222), while Andrew Lorraine was the only pitcher to lose two games in the Series that year. The Aragua club also featured RF Robert Pérez and pitchers Orber Moreno, Víctor Moreno and José Santiago, among others.

== Note ==
Of 33 players on the Series rosters included on the 40-man Major League 2008 rosters, 30 were on the Dominican Republic teams. According to MLB, the Caribbean Confederation officials considered moving up the start of the 2009 tournament from the first week of February to the last week of January, because it gives the players at least 10 days before they are expected to report to their respective camps in Spring Training. This year's tournament ended six days before pitchers and catchers begin reporting. The change would encourage more participation for major leaguers from Mexico, Dominican Republic, Puerto Rico and Venezuela. Adding new teams to the tournament could also be an option for the future of the Caribbean Series.

== Final standings ==
Country	Club	W	L	W/L %	GB	Managers
Dominican Republic	Tigres del Licey	5	1	.833	–	Héctor de la Cruz
Dominican Republic	Águilas Cibaeñas	3	3	.500	2.0	Félix Fermín
Mexico	Yaquis de Obregón	2	4	.333	3.0	Homar Rojas
Venezuela	Tigres de Aragua	2	4	.333	3.0	Buddy Bailey

Individual leaders
Player/Club	Statistic
Nelson Cruz / DOM 2	Batting average	.407
José Bautista / DOM 2 Robert Saucedo / MEX; Miguel Tejada / DOM 1	Home runs	2
Robert Saucedo / MEX	RBI	6
Robert Saucedo / MEX	Runs	7
Nelson Cruz / DOM 2	Hits	11
Nelson Cruz / DOM 2	Doubles	3
Richard Paz / VEN; Tony Peña / DOM 1 Reggie Taylor / MEX; Carlos Valencia / MEX	Triples	1
Alfredo Amézaga / MEX	Stolen bases	3
Luis Maza / Venezuela	OBP	.483
Nelson Cruz / DOM 2	SLG	.630
Nelson Cruz / DOM 2	OPS	1.037
Ramón Ortiz / DOM 2	Wins	2
Joselo Díaz / DOM 2	Strikeouts	8
Ramón Ortiz / DOM 2	ERA	0.00
Ramón Ortiz / DOM 2	Innings pitched	11 1/3
Carlos Mármol / DOM 2 Arnie Muñoz / DOM 1	Saves	2
Denny Bautista / DOM 1 Randy Choate / DOM 1 Víctor Moreno / VEN; Adrián Ramírez / MEX	Games pitched	4
Awards
Ramón Ortiz / DOM 2	Most Valuable Player
Héctor de la Cruz / DOM 2	Manager

All-Star Team
Name/Club	Position
Matt Tupman / DOM 2	catcher
Mendy López / DOM 1	first baseman
Rafael Furcal / DOM 1	second baseman
Luis Maza / VEN	third baseman
Tony Peña / DOM 1	shortstop
Albino Contreras / MEX	left fielder
Selwyn Langaigne / VEN	center fielder
Nelson Cruz / DOM 2	right fielder
Robert Saucedo / MEX	designated hitter
Ramón Ortiz / DOM 2	RH pitcher
Arnaldo Muñoz / DOM	LH pitcher
Héctor de la Cruz / DOM 2	manager

=== Scoreboards ===
==== Game 1, February 2 ====
Team	1	2	3	4	5	6	7	8	9	R	H	E
Tigres del Licey Dom 2	0	0	2	2	1	0	0	0	1	6	11	1
Venezuela	0	0	1	0	0	3	0	0	0	4	8	4
WP: José Capellán (1-0) LP: José Santiago (0-1) Sv: Carlos Mármol (1); Home runs: DOM 2: Rafael Belliard (1); VEN: None

==== Game 2, February 2 ====
Team	1	2	3	4	5	6	7	8	9	R	H	E
Mexico	0	2	0	0	2	2	0	0	0	6	10	1
Dominican Republic 1	6	2	0	1	0	0	4	0	x	13	17	0
WP: Denny Bautista (1-0) LP: Alberto Castillo (0-1); Home runs: MEX: None; DOM 1: Miguel Tejada 2 (2), Brayan Peña (1)

- Note: With his two homers (12 and 13), Tejada became the all-time home run leader in the Series, surpassing the 11 homers hit by Venezuelan Tony Armas.

==== Game 3, February 3 ====
Team	1	2	3	4	5	6	7	8	9	10	11	R	H	E
Tigres del Licey Dom 2	0	1	0	0	0	0	0	0	0	0	1	2	9	2
Mexico	0	0	1	0	0	0	0	0	0	0	0	1	8	0
WP: Jailen Peguero (1-0) LP: Adrián Ramírez (0-1); Home runs: DOM 2: José Bautista (1); MEX: None

==== Game 4, February 3 ====
Team	1	2	3	4	5	6	7	8	9	R	H	E
Dominican Republic 1	2	0	0	0	0	0	1	0	0	3	7	1
Venezuela	0	0	1	0	0	0	0	0	0	1	10	0
WP: Francisco Cruceta (1-0) LP: Andrew Lorraine (0-1) Sv: Arnie Muñoz (1); Home runs: DOM 1: None; VEN: Luis Ugueto (1)

==== Game 5, February 4 ====
Team	1	2	3	4	5	6	7	8	9	R	H	E
Venezuela	0	0	2	0	1	0	0	0	2	5	11	0
Mexico	0	0	0	0	0	0	0	0	0	0	7	0
WP: Giovanni Carrara (1-0) LP: Justin Lehr (0-1)

==== Game 6, February 4 ====
Team	1	2	3	4	5	6	7	8	9	R	H	E
Dominican Republic 1	0	0	0	0	0	0	0	0	2	2	8	0
Tigres del Licey Dom 2	0	0	0	1	0	0	4	0	0	5	8	1
WP: Ramón Ortiz (1-0) LP: Fabio Castro (0-1) Sv: Jailen Peguero (1); Home runs: DOM 1: None; DOM 2: Yordany Ramírez (1)

==== Game 7, February 5 ====
Team	1	2	3	4	5	6	7	8	9	R	H	E
Venezuela	0	0	0	0	0	0	0	1	0	1	6	1
Tigres del Licey Dom 2	0	0	0	0	0	0	1	1	X	2	5	0
WP: Jesús Colomé (1-0) LP: Víctor Moreno (0-1) Sv: Carlos Mármol (2); Home runs: VEN: Alex Delgado (1); DOM 2: Nelson Cruz (1)

==== Game 8, February 5 ====
Team	1	2	3	4	5	6	7	8	9	R	H	E
Dominican Republic 1	0	2	0	0	1	0	1	0	0	4	12	3
Mexico	0	0	1	0	0	0	0	0	0	1	6	0
WP: Joselo Díaz (1-0) LP: Dan Serafini (0-1) Sv: Arnie Muñoz (2)

==== Game 9, February 6 ====
Team	1	2	3	4	5	6	7	8	9	10	R	H	E
Mexico	0	1	0	0	0	0	0	0	3	3	7	12	1
Tigres del Licey Dom 2	1	0	0	2	0	1	0	0	0	0	4	8	1
WP: Nelson Figueroa (1-0) LP: Oneli Pérez (0-1); Home runs: MEX: Robert Saucedo 2 (2); DOM 2: José Bautista (2)

==== Game 10, February 6 ====
Team	1	2	3	4	5	6	7	8	9	R	H	E
Venezuela	0	0	0	1	1	1	3	2	0	8	15	0
Dominican Republic 1	0	0	1	0	0	0	0	4	0	5	10	1
WP: Iván Blanco (1-0) LP: Bartolo Colón (0-1) Sv: Francisco Buttó (1); Home runs: VEN: Ramón A. Castro (1); DOM 1: Edwin Encarnación (1)

==== Game 11, February 7 ====
Team	1	2	3	4	5	6	7	8	9	R	H	E
Mexico	0	0	0	2	0	0	0	0	5	7	13	1
Venezuela	0	0	1	1	0	0	0	0	3	5	13	1
WP: Rolando Valdez (1-0) LP: Andrew Lorraine (0-2) Sv: Francisco Rodríguez (1)

==== Game 12, February 7 ====
Team	1	2	3	4	5	6	7	8	9	R	H	E
Tigres del Licey Dom 2	0	1	1	4	0	0	0	0	2	8	15	0
Dominican Republic 1	0	0	2	0	0	0	0	0	0	2	7	0
WP: Ramón Ortiz (2-0) LP: Alfredo Simón (0-1); Home runs: DOM 2: None; DOM 1: Rafael Furcal (1)

== See also ==
- Ballplayers who have played in the Series

== Sources ==
- Antero Núñez, José. Series del Caribe. Jefferson, Caracas, Venezuela: Impresos Urbina, C.A., 1987.
- Gutiérrez, Daniel. Enciclopedia del Béisbol en Venezuela – 1895–2006 . Caracas, Venezuela: Impresión Arte, C.A., 2007.
