= Iván Blanco =

Iván Blanco may refer to:

- Iván Blanco (baseball)
- Ivan Blanco (politician)
