= Rafael Álvarez =

Rafael Álvarez may refer to:

- Rafael Álvarez (baseball) (born 1977), Venezuelan baseball player
- Rafael Álvarez (diver) (born 1971), Spanish diver
- Rafael Alvarez (born 1958), American author
