= José Santiago (2000s pitcher) =

Puerto Rican baseball player (born 1974)

- Pitcher
- Born: November 5, 1974 (age 51); Fajardo, Puerto Rico
- Batted: Right Threw: Right

Professional debut
- MLB: June 7, 1997, for the Kansas City Royals
- CPBL: August 12, 2006, for the Macoto Cobras

Last appearance
- MLB: August 9, 2005, for the New York Mets
- CPBL: August 25, 2006, for the Macoto Cobras

MLB statistics
- Win–loss record: 17–22
- Earned run average: 4.36
- Strikeouts: 153

CPBL statistics
- Win–loss record: 0–2
- Earned run average: 5.65
- Strikeouts: 6
- Stats at Baseball Reference

Teams
- Kansas City Royals (1997–2001); Philadelphia Phillies (2001–2002); Cleveland Indians (2003); New York Mets (2005); Macoto Cobras (2006)

José Rafael Santiago Fuentes (born November 5, 1974) is a Puerto Rican former professional baseball pitcher. He played in Major League Baseball for the Kansas City Royals, Philadelphia Phillies, Cleveland Indians, and New York Mets. Listed at 6' 3" [1.90 m], 200 lb. [91 k], Santiago batted and threw right-handed. He was born in Fajardo, Puerto Rico.

== Playing career ==
Santiago was drafted by the Kansas City Royals in the 70th round of the 1994 Major League Baseball draft. He debuted with the Royals in 1997, bouncing back and forth between the major league club and the minor leagues until being traded to the Philadelphia Phillies in 2001. The Phillies released him after the 2002 season. In 2003, he played for the Cleveland Indians and in 2004, he signed with the Chicago White Sox organization, though he saw no time in the majors that year. In 2005, he signed a minor league contract with the New York Mets and was called up to the majors in July.

After that, Santiago was a member of the Puerto Rico national team in the 2006 World Baseball Classic and joined the Olmecas de Tabasco for the rest of the summer.

In addition to playing for the New Orleans Zephyrs in the Mets farm system in 2008, Santiago pitched for the Gigantes de Carolina Puerto Rico representing team in the Caribbean Series. He then signed with the Dorados de Chihuahua in 2009, finishing the season with a record of 7–11 and an ERA of 5.53. He retired after that season.

In between, Santiago played winter ball with the Cardenales de Lara and Leones del Caracas clubs of the Venezuelan Professional Baseball League.

== Retirement ==
=== Coaching ===
After retiring, Santiago became a pitching coach. In 2015, he took over the role for the Gigantes de Carolina of the Liga Profesional Roberto Clemente. After coincidentally meeting Edwin Díaz during the 2016 offseason, Santiago began training the then-Seattle Mariners reliever.

=== Other baseball initiatives ===
Santiago also serves other roles within baseball, such as that of pitching coach of several teams of the local Doble A amateur league including Cocoteros de Loiza, Guardianes de Dorado, Halcones de Gurabo and currently the Artesanos de Las Piedras. In 2016, he served as the head pitching coach of MLB's Development Program in Puerto Rico, then he was recruited by local baseball academies such as PRoBaseball Academy and IBAHS. Santiago runs a college placement program in Puerto Rico called Optimus Prospects Baseball Academy. He also leads a baseball initiative based in the municipality of Loíza.

== Personal life ==
Santiago is currently living in his hometown of Loiza, Puerto Rico with his wife and former sports reporter, Sarai Colon. He has two children, Joselyn Marie and Ian Jareb Santiago. Santiago is a horse racing aficionado and has owned several thoroughbreds that competed at Hipódromo Camarero. He was also a known breeder for cockfights in Puerto Rico, where that sport was legal until 2019.
