= Carlos Rivera (baseball) =

Puerto Rican baseball player (born 1978)

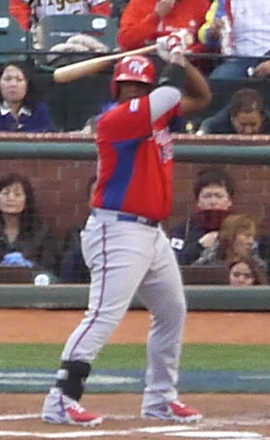
- Rivera batting for the Puerto Rico national team in 2013 World Baseball Classic

El Águila de Veracruz
- First baseman / Coach
- Born: June 10, 1978 (age 47); Fajardo, Puerto Rico
- Batted: Left Threw: Left

MLB debut
- June 22, 2003, for the Pittsburgh Pirates

Last MLB appearance
- May 6, 2004, for the Pittsburgh Pirates

MLB statistics
- Batting average: .218
- Home runs: 3
- Runs batted in: 11
- Stats at Baseball Reference

Teams
- Pittsburgh Pirates (2003–2004)
Medals
Representing Puerto Rico
Men's baseball
World Baseball Classic
Silver medal – second place	2013 San Francisco	Team

Carlos Alberto Rivera (born June 10, 1978) is a Puerto Rican former professional baseball first baseman and current coach for El Águila de Veracruz of the Mexican League. He played in Major League Baseball (MLB) for the Pittsburgh Pirates.

== Playing career ==
Rivera was drafted by the Pirates in the 10th round of the 1996 Major League Baseball draft. Rivera played his first professional season with their rookie-level Gulf Coast League Pirates in 1996, and last played with an MLB-affiliated team in 2006 with the Colorado Rockies' Triple-A team, the Colorado Springs Sky Sox.

In 2007, Rivera hit .410 with 16 home runs and 73 RBI in 101 games for the Oaxaca Warriors in the Mexican League and was a midseason All-Star. After not playing during the 2008 regular season, he played winter ball in his native Puerto Rico for the Ponce Lions and hit .321 with 31 RBI in 36 games. He also represented Puerto Rico in the 2009 Caribbean Series.

After starting the season with the Petroleros de Minatitlán of the Mexican League, Rivera signed with the Wichita Wingnuts of the American Association on July 30.

== Coaching career ==
Rivera began the 2025 season as the hitting coach for the Sultanes de Monterrey of the Mexican League. On June 18, 2025, Rivera was fired by Monterrey.

On June 19, 2025, El Águila de Veracruz of the Mexican League added Rivera to their coaching staff.

== See also ==
- List of Major League Baseball players from Puerto Rico
