= Josué Matos =

Puerto Rican baseball player (born 1978)

- Pitcher
- Born: 15 March 1978 (age 48); Mayagüez, Puerto Rico
- Bats: Right Throws: Right
- Stats at Baseball Reference

Teams
- Puerto Rico national baseball team

Josué Matos (born March 15, 1978) is a Puerto Rican professional baseball pitcher. Matos has spent over a decade in pro baseball and has pitched at times for the Puerto Rico national baseball team. He is currently the pitching coach for the Brooklyn Cyclones.

== Playing career ==
Matos was picked in the 27th round of the 1996 Major League Baseball draft by the Seattle Mariners as a draft-and-follow selection. The right-hander spent a season at junior college then made his pro debut in 1997 with the Arizona League Mariners (1–0, Sv, 4.17, 50 K, 6 BB in 45 1/3 IP) and Everett AquaSox (2.08 in 2 G). The right-hander returned to the AZL Mariners for '98 and went 3–0 with a 2.20 ERA in 17 games, fanning 51 batters in 41 innings while giving up just 29 hits.

In 1999, the Mayagüez native became a starter and was 9–9 with a 4.63 ERA for the Wisconsin Timber Rattlers; he struck out over 3 times as many as he walked and averaged nearly a K per inning. In the winter of 1999–2000, Josue had a 3-3, 2.79 record for the San Juan Senators of the Puerto Rican League. Returning to the US, he split time between the Lancaster JetHawks (3–3, 2.64, 93 K in 88 2/3 IP) and New Haven Ravens (4–5, 3.63).

Matos' rise was slowed in 2001 as he missed a full season due to injury. He returned in 2002 to pitch for the San Antonio Missions (1–0, 4.91 in three games) and Tacoma Rainiers (4–7, 5.92, .300 average allowed), struggling in his Triple-A debut. In '03, Josue returned to the bullpen, where he excelled for San Antonio, going 7–2 with 4 saves and a 2.24 ERA in 48 outings. He held opponents to a .187 average and fanned 104 in 88 1/3 IP.

In 2004, Matos moved to the Toronto Blue Jays organization and pitched for the Syracuse SkyChiefs. There, he was 7–6 with a 5.04 ERA in a starting role primarily. He led Jays farmhands in walks (56). In the winter of 2004–2005, Josue went 5–2 with a 2.63 ERA for the Gigantes de Carolina; he tied Evan Thomas and Jonathan Albaladejo for the Puerto Rican League lead in victories. He split his time in the Jays system between Syracuse (5–3, 6.63, .313 opponent average) and the New Hampshire Fisher Cats (0–1, 1.45 in 9 G, .206 opponent average). He also moved to the Philadelphia Phillies organization during the year, going 3–0 with a 1.23 ERA in 7 games for the Reading Phillies.

Matos pitched for Puerto Rico in the 2005 Baseball World Cup but went 0–3 with a 4.76 ERA, losing to Team USA, Japan and Australia. The rest of Puerto Rico's staff was 6–2. He did better in the 2005–2006 Puerto Rican League, going 4–0 with a 2.27 ERA for Carolina and finishing second in ERA behind Kyle Middleton.

Matos was selected to pitch for Puerto Rico in the 2006 World Baseball Classic and pitched one game, in Puerto Rico's 12–2 upset of the Cuban national baseball team. Josue relieved Dicky Gonzalez to begin the bottom of the 5th. He walked Yoandy Garlobo and allowed a single to Carlos Tabares. He then retired Eduardo Paret on a grounder, got Michel Enríquez to pop up then got Yulieski Gourriel to fly out. Willie Collazo relieved him in the 6th.

In the regular season, he was with the Newark Bears (0–1, 2.31 in 2 G) and Monclova Steelers (4.15 in 1 G). He spent 2007 with the North Shore Spirit (0–2, 5.74) and Alexandria Aces (0–1, 7.56), again failing to hold down a regular spot anywhere.

The veteran hurler pitched for Puerto Rico in the 2008 Americas Baseball Cup, which his country won. He outdueled Francisco Campos of Mexico 2–1 in the opener but lasted just one inning against Panama. He went 1–0 with a 2.25 ERA in the event.

In the 2008–2009 Puerto Rican League, Matos had a 5–2, 2.89 record for Carolina. He then won his only appearance in the 2009 Caribbean Series, tossing 5 shutout innings of 2-hit ball but walking six Licey Tigers. He is on Puerto Rico's provisional roster for the 2009 World Baseball Classic.

== Coaching career ==
Matos was named as the pitching coach for the Kingsport Mets of the New York Mets organization for the 2018 season.

== Sources ==
- 1998–2009 Baseball Almanacs
- SABR database
- Matos's appearance in the 2006 WBC
- IBAF
