= Adrián González =

Mexican-American baseball player (born 1982)

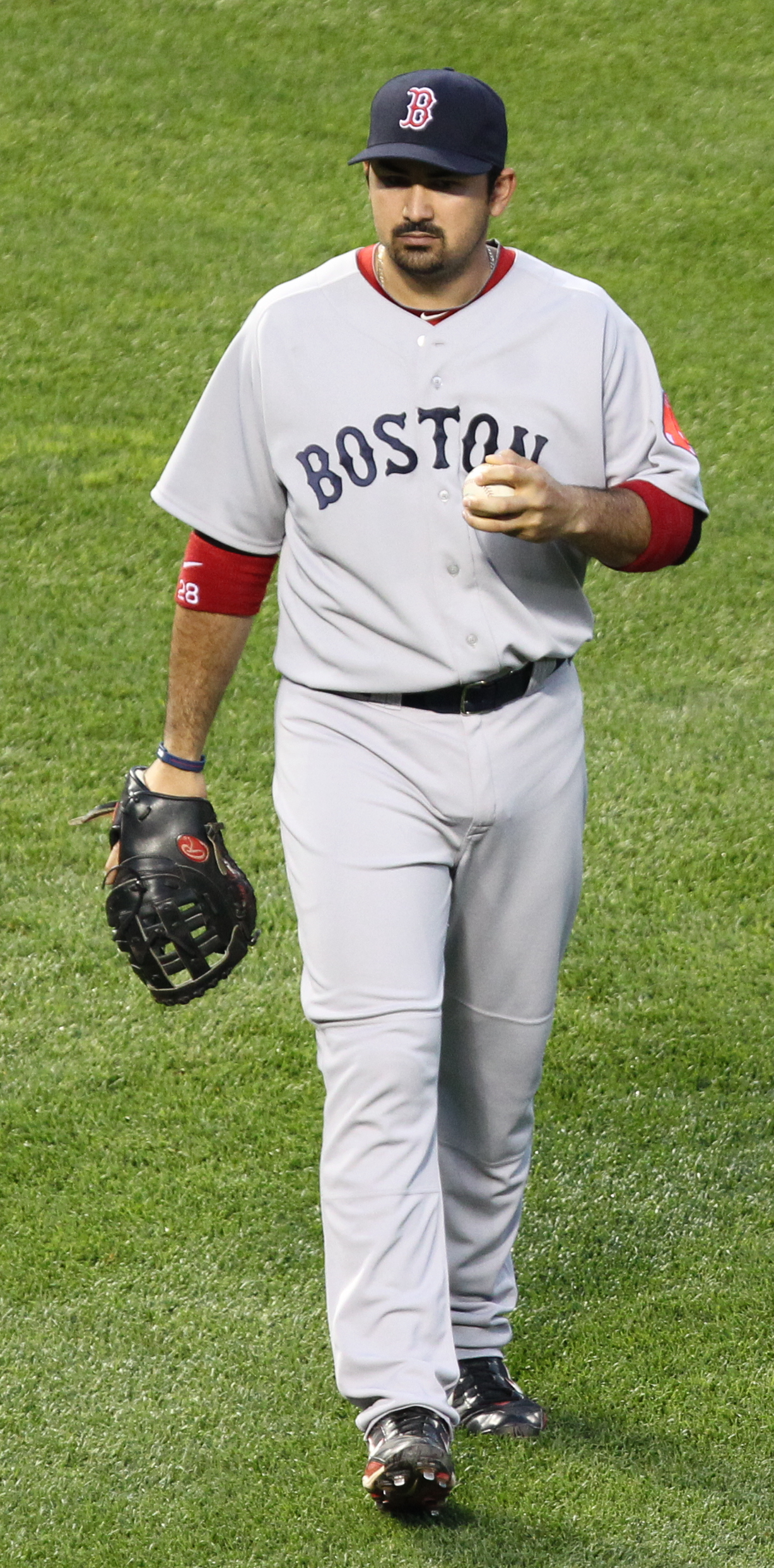
- González with the Boston Red Sox in 2011
- First baseman
- Born: May 8, 1982 (age 44); San Diego, California, U.S.
- Batted: Left Threw: Left

MLB debut
- April 18, 2004, for the Texas Rangers

Last MLB appearance
- June 10, 2018, for the New York Mets

MLB statistics
- Batting average: .287
- Hits: 2,050
- Home runs: 317
- Runs batted in: 1,202
- Stats at Baseball Reference

Teams
- Texas Rangers (2004–2005); San Diego Padres (2006–2010); Boston Red Sox (2011–2012); Los Angeles Dodgers (2012–2017); New York Mets (2018)

Career highlights and awards
- 5× All-Star (2008–2011, 2015); 4× Gold Glove Award (2008, 2009, 2011, 2014); 2× Silver Slugger Award (2011, 2014); MLB RBI leader (2014)

Adrián González Savín (born May 8, 1982), also known by his nicknames "A-Gon" and "Titán", is a Mexican-American former professional baseball first baseman. He played in Major League Baseball (MLB) for the Texas Rangers, San Diego Padres, Boston Red Sox, Los Angeles Dodgers, and New York Mets.

González was born in the United States, but was raised in Tijuana, Baja California, Mexico, until 1990, when he returned to the United States. He played for Mexico in the 2006, 2009, 2013, and the 2017 editions of the World Baseball Classic and the 2020 Olympic Games.

González was the first overall pick in the 2000 MLB draft by the Florida Marlins. He was traded to the Rangers, and made his MLB debut with them in 2004. He was traded to the Padres after the 2005 season, where he was an All-Star selection three times and a two-time Gold Glove Award winner. He was traded to the Red Sox after the 2010 season, and was traded to the Dodgers in August 2012. After playing for the Dodgers throughout the 2017 season, he was traded to the Atlanta Braves, but was released without playing for them. He then played for the Mets, who released him during the 2018 season.

== Early life ==
Adrián González was born in San Diego, California, to David and Alba González, both Mexican natives. González is the youngest of three boys; his brothers are David Jr. and Edgar, a former big leaguer. After his birth, his parents moved the family to Tijuana, where his father owned an air-conditioner business. The three boys grew up playing baseball in Mexico, where their father had been a member of the Mexico national baseball team. In 1990, the family returned to the United States, settling in Bonita, California.

While Adrián was drafted by the Florida Marlins out of high school, his brother Edgar Gonzalez attended San Diego State University and was selected by the Tampa Bay Rays in the 30th round of the 2000 draft. Edgar debuted in the major leagues as a utility man with the San Diego Padres in 2008, joining his brother as a teammate.

In 2012, David and Alba González were named George and Barbara Bush Little League Parents of the Year. In November 2012, González was honored as one of 30 "exemplary citizens" by the mayor of Tijuana in an official ceremony.

González was projected to be a late first-round pick out of Eastlake High School in Chula Vista, California; however, his stock increased with his senior-year performance. In his senior year, he hit.645 with 13 home runs and 34 runs batted in.

== Professional career ==
=== Florida Marlins (2000–2003) ===
In June 2000, González became the first infield position player to be drafted first overall since Alex Rodriguez in 1993. He was given a $3 million signing bonus by the Florida Marlins. While in the Marlins organization, González played with the Gulf Coast League Marlins, Kane County Cougars, Utica Blue Sox, Portland Sea Dogs (2002), Albuquerque Isotopes (2003), and Carolina Mudcats (2003). With the Single-A Kane County Cougars in his second professional season, González hit.312 with 17 home runs and 103 RBIs in 127 games. As a result, he was selected by the Midwest League as its Most Valuable Player and Prospect of the Year. He also played in the All-Star Futures Game.

=== Texas Rangers (2004–2005) ===
After a wrist injury, the Marlins felt González would be hindered swinging the bat, so they included González in a June 2003 trade with the Texas Rangers, along with Ryan Snare and minor leaguer Will Smith, to acquire relief pitcher Ugueth Urbina to aid their championship drive. González played with the Rangers' Class-AA team, the Frisco RoughRiders, until he made his major-league debut against the Seattle Mariners on April 18, 2004. He was hitless in three at-bats. He recorded his first base hit on April 20 against Ramón Ortiz of the Anaheim Angels and his first home run on April 25 off Kevin Jarvis of the Seattle Mariners. He played in 16 games for Texas in 2004 and in 43 games in 2005, with a combined batting average of.229 and 7 homers.

=== San Diego Padres (2006–2010) ===
==== 2006 ====
After the season, González was traded to the San Diego Padres along with pitcher Chris Young and outfielder Terrmel Sledge. In return, the Rangers received Adam Eaton and Akinori Otsuka. Originally seen as an eventual replacement for Ryan Klesko at first base, González was given the job when Klesko underwent shoulder surgery.

With extended playing time at first base in 2006, González continued to improve his hitting and defense. On July 23, 2006, he was named the NL Player of the Week. In his first full season, he led the Padres in batting average (.304) and home runs (24). He was the first player in Petco Park history to have more than one multiple home run game. He was named the Padres MVP for 2006.

==== 2007 ====
On March 31, 2007, González agreed to a $9.5 million, four-year deal, with a club option for $5.5 million in 2011. In the 2007 season, he led the Padres in home runs again, with 30, and had a team-high 100 RBIs. He led all Major League first basemen with 161 games and a career-high 46 doubles.

==== 2008 ====
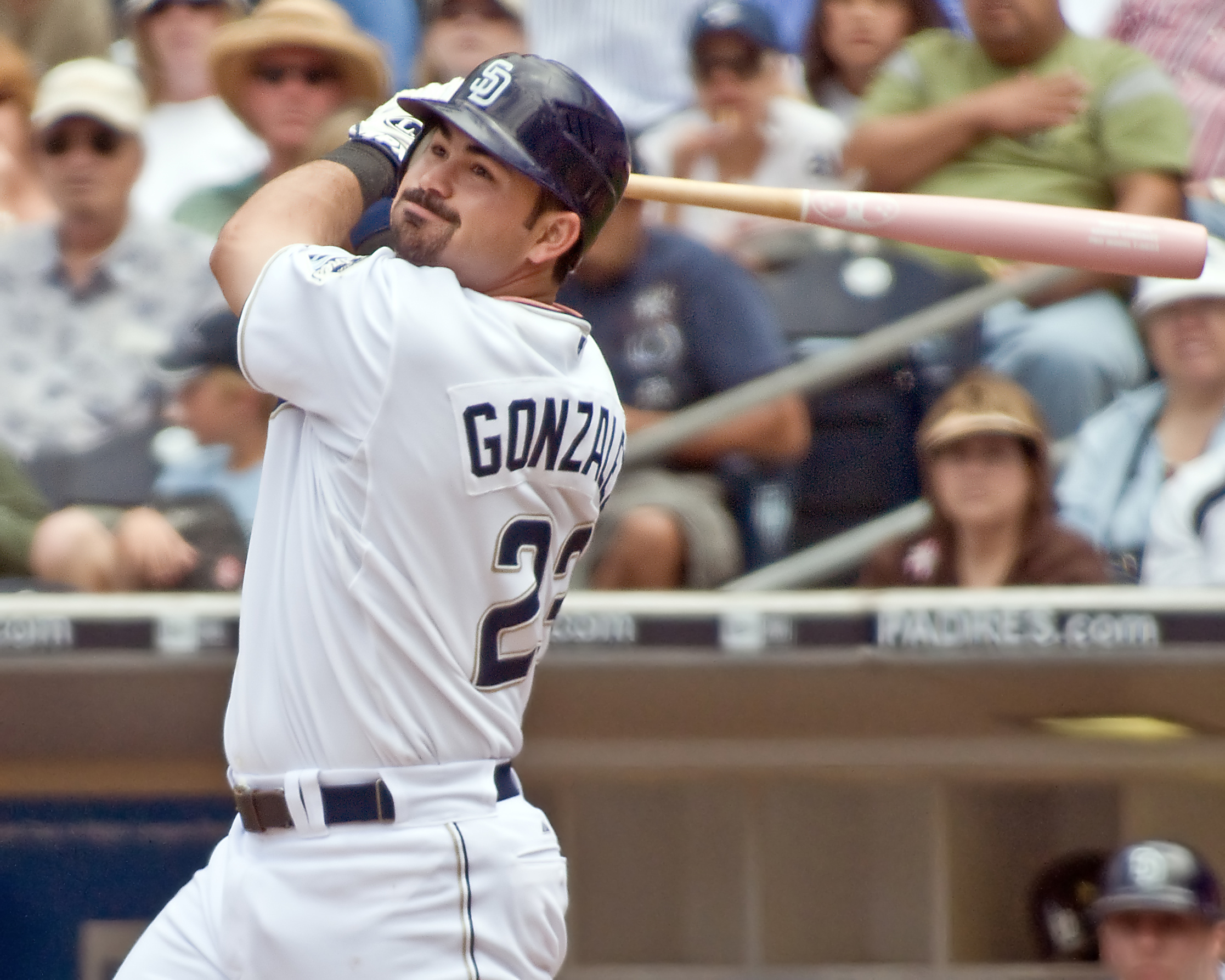
González after a swing with the Padres in 2008

In the 2008 season, González finished with a.279 average and once again led the Padres with 36 home runs and 119 RBIs. He was elected to the MLB All-Star Game as a reserve. In the exhibition, he went 1 for 3 with a single and a sacrifice fly, driving in Miguel Tejada. He won his first Gold Glove Award in 2008 at first base and set career highs in games played (162), home runs (36), RBI (119), runs scored (103), walks (74), and slugging percentage (.510). He was named the Padres MVP for the second time.

==== 2009 ====
González played winter ball in the Mexican Pacific League with the Venados de Mazatlán. In the Caribbean Series, he led his team past the Dominican Republic's Tigres del Licey with a record-setting 3 home runs on February 4.

González hit 23 homers, leading the majors in that category through May 2009 despite playing his home games at Petco Park, which Padres statisticians describe as an "extreme pitcher's park." On May 18, González was described as being one of the two most underrated players in the National League according to an MLB.com poll of major league executives and managers. On June 1, he was named the NL Co-Player of the Week for the second time in his career. During that week, González hit four home runs, tallied 10 RBIs, and had a 1.000 slugging percentage. González was elected to the MLB All-Star Game after voting by fellow players, managers and coaches. He subsequently participated in that year's Home Run Derby, where he hit two home runs in the first round. On August 1, González batted 6-for-6 with three RBI as the Padres topped the Milwaukee Brewers 13–6. González's six hits are the most by any Padre in a nine-inning game. Three others have accomplished the feat, but did it in extra-inning contests. González hit five singles and a double.

He led the majors in walks in 2009 with 119 and set a major league record with eight consecutive multi-walk games, a record which still stands as of 2020. He also hit 40 home runs for the first time in his career. He was named the Padres team MVP for 2009, his third time honored.

==== 2010 ====
González started the 2010 season playing well. On May 24, he was named the NL Player of the Week for the fourth time in his career. On June 2, González hit a walk-off grand slam in the eleventh inning of a 5–1 victory over the New York Mets. In July, González was elected to participate in his third consecutive All-Star game.

During the 2010 season, González had 176 hits in 591 at-bats, good for a.298 batting average, his highest since hitting .304 in 2006. His 93 walks put him in third place in the NL behind only Prince Fielder (114) and Albert Pujols (103). He finished with 31 home runs and 101 RBI, the third time in his career he had 100 RBI or more. González played in 160 games on the year, tying him with Rickie Weeks for 5th in the NL. He scored 87 runs on the season, compiling 302 total bases, which also tied him with Weeks, for 6th in the NL. González was named team MVP for the third consecutive year and the fourth time overall with the Padres.

=== Boston Red Sox (2011–2012) ===
On December 6, 2010, González was traded to the Boston Red Sox for a package of right-handed pitcher Casey Kelly, first baseman Anthony Rizzo, outfielder Reymond Fuentes, and a player to be named later, later determined to be Eric Patterson.

On April 15, 2011, González and the Red Sox agreed to a seven-year contract extension worth $154 million through the 2018 season. On June 19, González hit his 1,000th career hit: a triple off of Milwaukee Brewers pitcher Yovani Gallardo.

On July 3, 2011, González was selected to the All-Star Game in Arizona along with teammates Josh Beckett, Jacoby Ellsbury, David Ortiz, Kevin Youkilis, and Jon Lester. González hit a home run in the game and was responsible for the only run for the American League. Additionally, Ortiz selected González as one of three sluggers to join him in the Home Run Derby, where he finished second to Robinson Canó. González tied a record for most home runs in the final round of the home run derby at 11, which was then surpassed by the victor Canó.

González was named AL Player of the Month for June 2011 with a .404 average (40 for 99) – the best in the Majors for that month. After placing second in the 2011 Home Run Derby, González faced a home-run slump until he hit five home runs in ten at-bats on August 23–25.

On November 21, González finished seventh in MVP voting, trailing his teammate Ellsbury in second and the winner, Detroit Tigers ace Justin Verlander.

González appeared on the cover of baseball video game MLB 12: The Show. In 2012, González appeared in 123 games with the Red Sox, hitting .300 with 15 homers and 86 RBI.

=== Los Angeles Dodgers (2012–2017) ===
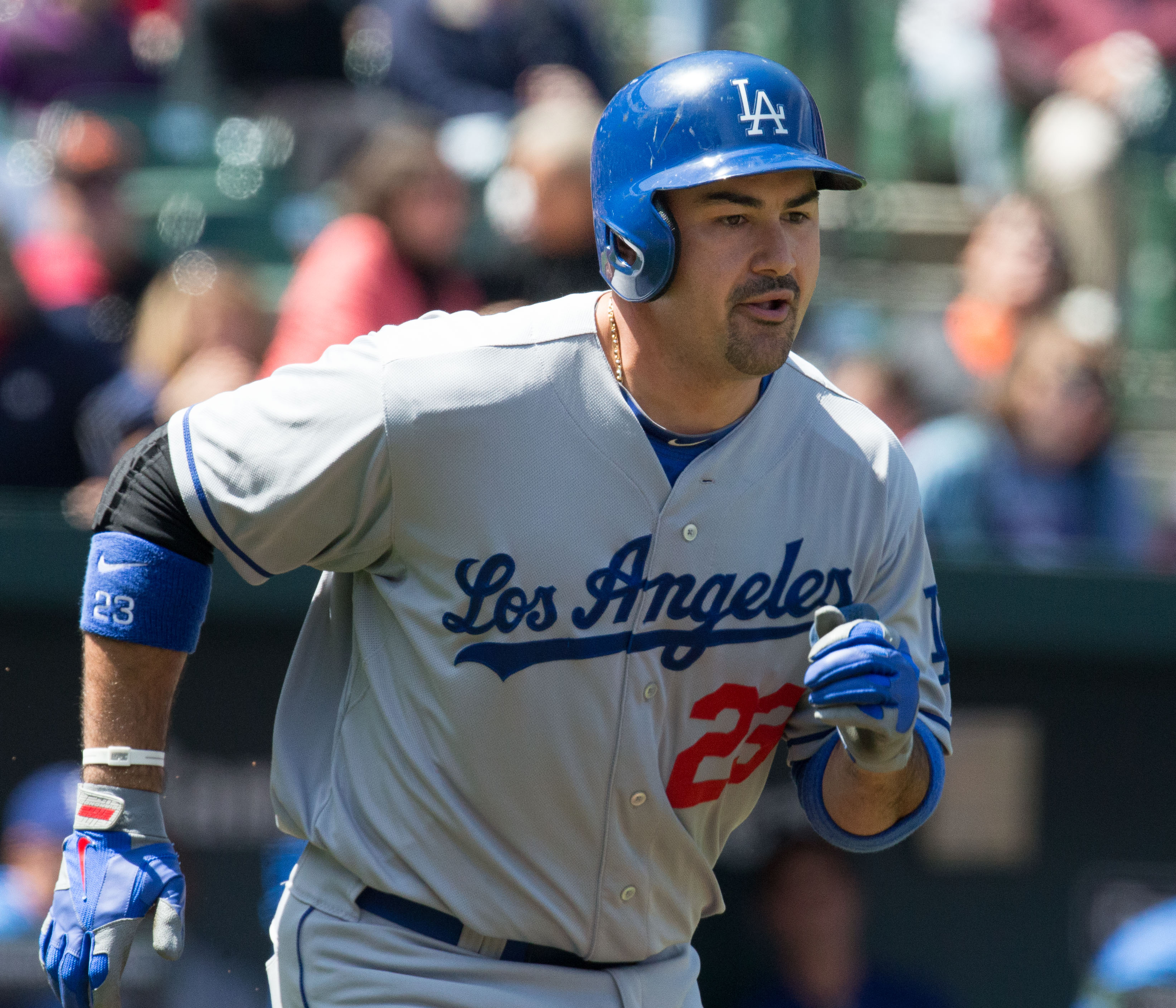
González in 2013

==== 2012 ====
On August 25, 2012, González was traded to the Los Angeles Dodgers (along with Josh Beckett, Nick Punto and Carl Crawford) and $11 million in cash for James Loney, Iván DeJesús Jr., Allen Webster and two players to be named later (Jerry Sands and Rubby De La Rosa). In his first at bat with the Dodgers that same day, he hit a three-run home run against the Miami Marlins. In 36 games with the Dodgers, he hit .297 with 3 homers and 22 RBI.

==== 2013 ====
In the 2013 season, González appeared in 157 games for the Dodgers and hit .293 with 22 home runs and 100 RBI. He was a candidate for the final vote at the All-Star Game but was not chosen for the game.

In Game 5 of the NLCS against the St. Louis Cardinals, González went 3 for 4 with 2 home runs. The Dodgers would eventually lose the series in six games.

==== 2014 ====
González finished the 2014 season with 116 RBI, most in the majors. He was the Dodgers' nominee for the Hank Aaron Award, after hitting 27 home runs in 159 games. However, his batting average of .276 was the lowest of his career. He finished up the season by winning the Silver Slugger Award for NL first baseman and also won several awards for his defense at first base, including the Gold Glove Award, Fielding Bible Award and Wilson Defensive Player of the Year Award.

==== 2015 ====
González opened the 2015 season with five home runs in the first three games of the season, including three on April 8 against Andrew Cashner. He was the first MLB player to hit five home runs in the first three games of the season. By homering in his fifth consecutive game, dating back to the end of the 2014 season, he tied the team record, which he shares with Roy Campanella (1950), Shawn Green (2001), Matt Kemp (2010), and Joc Pederson (2015). He won the player of the week award as a result of that performance. He was also awarded with the National League Player of the Month award for April as he hit .383 with eight home runs and 19 RBI in the month. He recorded his 1,000th career RBI when he hit a two-run home run off Julio Teherán of the Atlanta Braves on May 26. Gonzalez was selected to the All-Star Game, the first Dodger first baseman selected since Nomar Garciaparra in 2006. He finished the season by hitting .275 in 156 games with 28 home runs and 90 RBI, the lowest RBI total he had since 2006.

==== 2016 ====
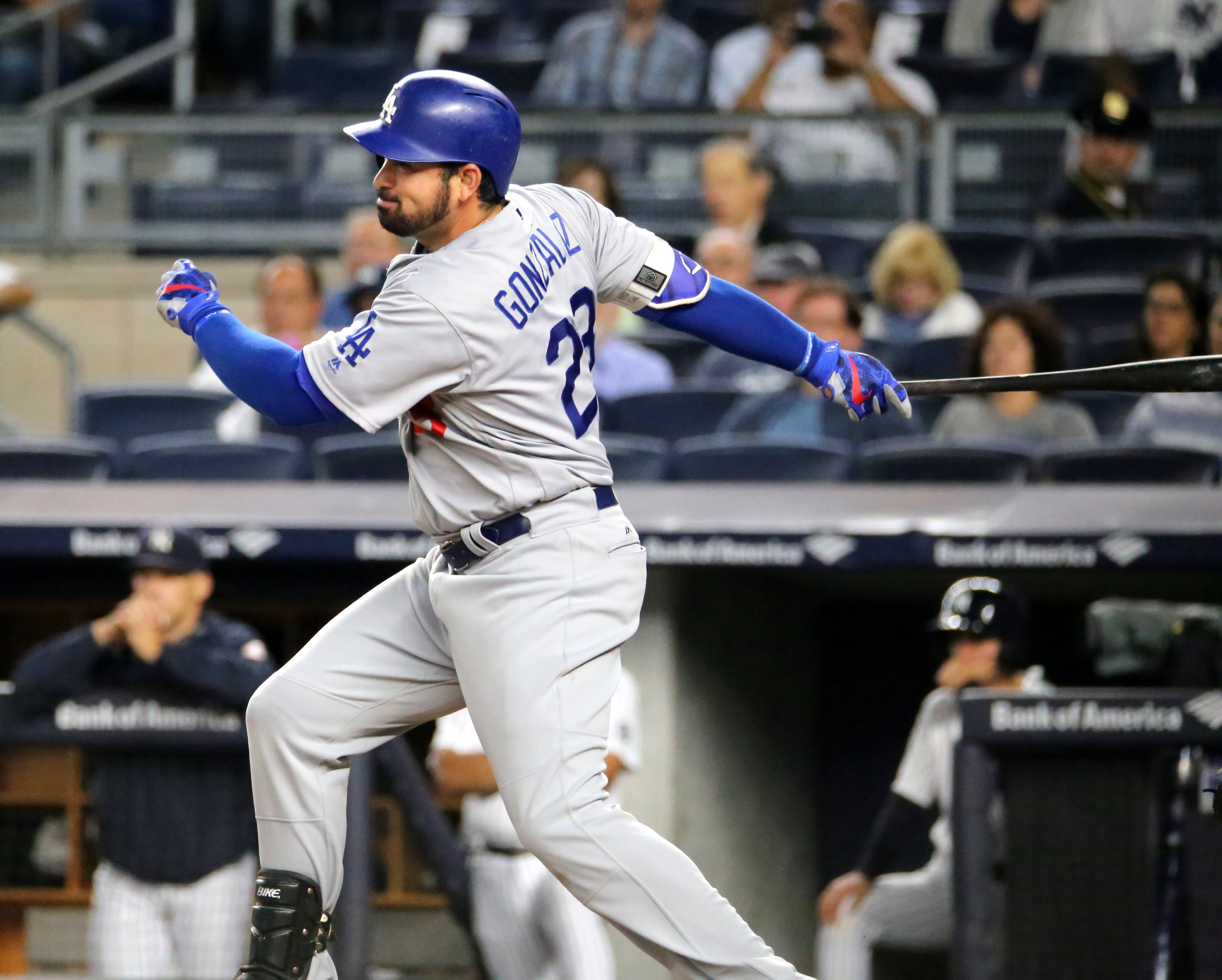
González in 2016

González played for the Mexico national baseball team in the World Baseball Classic qualifiers during spring training in March 2016. The team was managed by his brother Edgar. On June 22, 2016, during a game against the Washington Nationals, Gonzalez made a highlight-reel catch after a ball in foul territory deflected off Chase Utley's glove and off Gonzalez's leg. On August 7, he hit his 300th career home run against the Boston Red Sox. On the season he appeared in 156 games, with a .285 batting average, 18 homers and 90 RBI. It was the fewest home runs he had hit in a season since 2012.

==== 2017 ====
On May 5, 2017, González was placed on the 10-day disabled list (DL) due to right elbow soreness. It was the first time in his MLB career that González was put on the DL. González recorded his 2,000th career hit with a double off Johnny Barbato of the Pittsburgh Pirates on August 22. González dealt with lingering back issues during the 2017 season, which caused him to spend half the season on the DL and lose playing time to rookie Cody Bellinger at first base. For the 2017 season, González only appeared in 71 games, batting .242/.287/.355 with 30 RBIs. He was shut down for the season in September and did not appear on the Dodgers playoff roster. In his final at-bat with the Dodgers, Gonzalez hit a home run against the Padres, giving him the rare distinction of having homered in both his first and last at-bats with the team.

On December 16, 2017, the Dodgers traded González, Charlie Culberson, Scott Kazmir, Brandon McCarthy, and $4.5 million to the Atlanta Braves for Matt Kemp. Immediately following the trade, the Braves designated González for assignment, then released him two days later. González waived his no-trade clause to facilitate the trade, which he did because he wanted to test free agency.

=== New York Mets ===
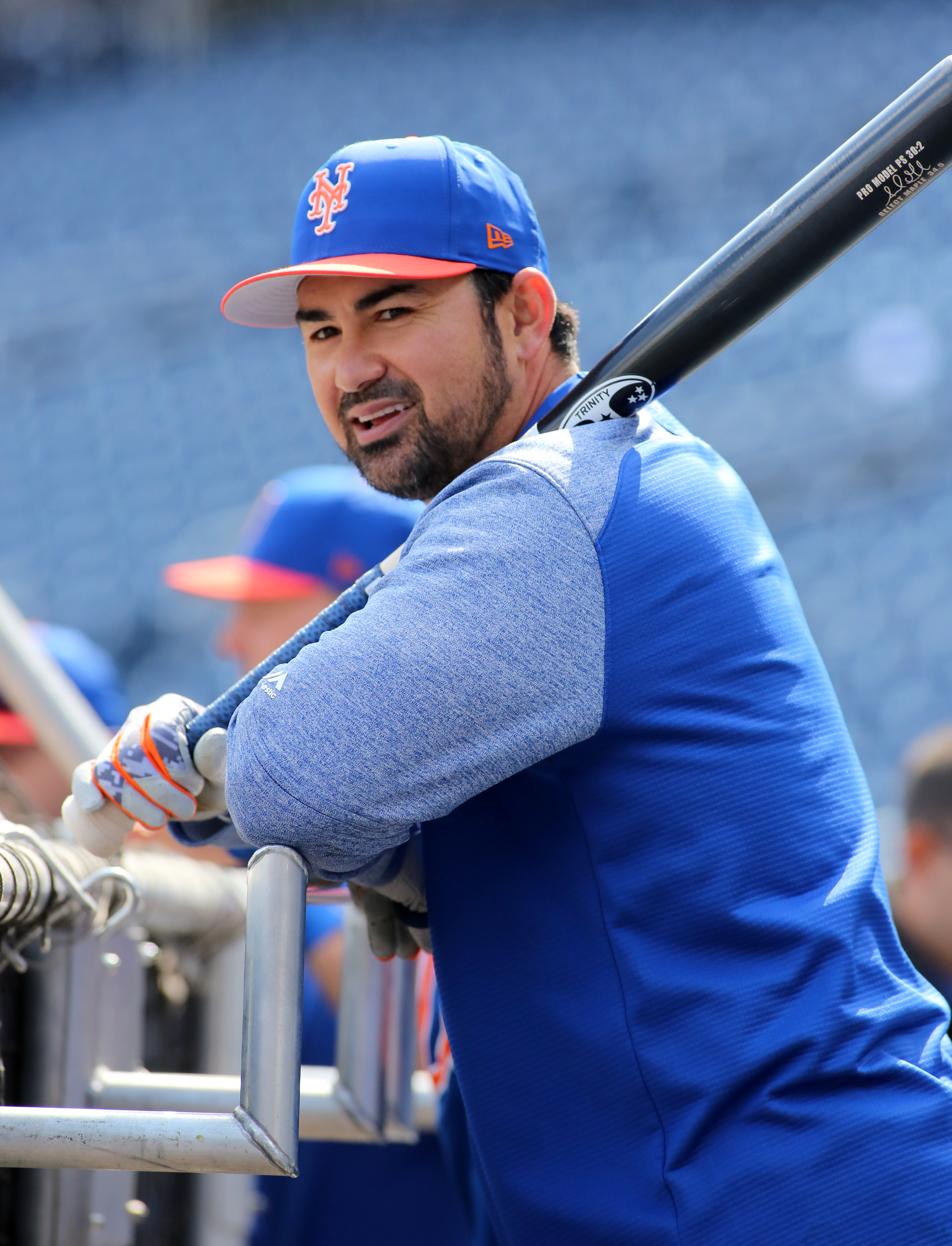
Gonzalez with the Mets in 2018

On January 18, 2018, González signed a one-year contract with the New York Mets. He was still due $21.5 million from his 2011 contract extension, with the Mets paying him $545,000 for the season.

On June 10, 2018, the Mets granted González his unconditional release. In 54 games with the Mets, he batted .237/.299/.373; he had just three hits in his final 27 at bats with the team.

=== Mariachis de Guadalajara ===
On March 30, 2021, González announced his return to baseball and officially signed with the Mariachis de Guadalajara of the Mexican League. On July 19, González announced that he would retire from professional baseball following the conclusion of the Mexican League season. In 43 games for Guadalajara, González batted .340/.412/.531 with 6 home runs and 41 RBI. He officially announced his retirement from professional baseball on February 5, 2022.

== Personal life ==
González and his wife Betsy reside in the San Diego County community of La Jolla. They have two daughters. The couple created The Adrián and Betsy González Foundation, which is focused on empowering underprivileged youth in areas of athletics, education and health. As one of his charitable endeavors, González paid for the refurbishing of the baseball field in the Tijuana sports complex where he played as a youth.

González is a Christian and engraved on his bats is "PS 27:1" for verse 1 from Psalm 27. González has spoken about his faith saying, "I don't want to be remembered in baseball. I want to be remembered as a good witness for Christ. ... I'm just trying to use this platform to bring people to Christ."

== See also ==
- List of first overall Major League Baseball draft picks
- List of Major League Baseball career home run leaders
- List of Major League Baseball career runs batted in leaders
- List of Major League Baseball single-game hits leaders
- Wilson Defensive Player of the Year Award
