= Héctor de la Cruz =

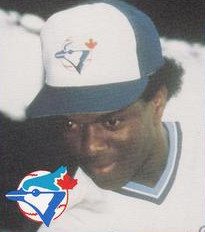
- de la Cruz in 1988
- Third baseman
- Born: October 12, 1965 (age 60); Santo Domingo, Dominican Republic
- Batted: Right Threw: Right

Professional debut
- NPB: May 18, 1991, for the Yomiuri Giants
- CPBL: March 20, 1992, for the Brother Elephants

Last appearance
- MLB: May 12, 1991, for the Yomiuri Giants
- CPBL: October 4, 1996, for the Sinon Bears

NPB statistics
- Batting average: .250
- Home runs: 0
- Runs batted in: 0

CPBL statistics
- Batting average: .267
- Home runs: 24
- Runs batted in: 97
- Stats at Baseball Reference

Teams
- Yomiuri Giants (1991); Brother Elephants (1992–1993); Sinon Bears (1996)

Héctor de la Cruz (born October 12, 1965) is a Dominican professional baseball manager. He played professional baseball for the Yomiuri Giants of Nippon Professional Baseball in 1991. A native of Sabana Perdida, Santo Domingo, he is nicknamed "La Manta" by close friends and family.

== Career ==
De la Cruz spent seven years in Minor league baseball as a third baseman/outfielder for the Toronto Blue Jays organization before becoming a coach in the Arizona Diamondbacks system. He also played professional baseball in Korea, Taiwan and Japan.

From 2001 through 2004, De la Cruz coached for the Missoula Osprey (2001–2002) of the Pioneer League and Class-A South Bend Silver Hawks (2003–2004). In 2005, he started his managerial career with Missoula, where he won the PL pennant in 2006. The next year he led the Single-A Visalia Oaks to a 77–63 record, as well as a playoff appearance in the California League.

From 2008 to 2009, he managed Class AA Mobile Bay Bears of the Southern League, before joining the Missoula Osprey of the Pioneer League for the next two years. He posted a 28–47 record in 2010, but improved to 41–35 in 2011, leading the Osprey to the best record among North Division teams, and their first PBL North Division First-Half championship since 1999. At the end of the season, he was named Pioneer League Manager of the Year.

He spent 2012 with the AZL Diamondbacks.

== Caribbean baseball ==
In an unusual situation during the 2007–2008 Dominican League regular season, the Tigres del Licey, managed by De La Cruz, finished second and would not qualify for the Caribbean Series, but had to replace Puerto Rico when the Puerto Rican circuit canceled its regular season for financial reasons. Then, De La Cruz led Licey to the 2008 CS title after defeating their Dominican rival Águilas Cibaeñas, Venezuela's Tigres de Aragua and Mexico's Yaquis de Obregón.
