= José Cobos (baseball) =

Mexican baseball player

- Pitcher
- Born: October 11, 1980 (age 45); Tuxpan, Veracruz, Mexico
- Bats: Right Throws: Right
- Stats at Baseball Reference

José Cobos (born October 11, 1980) is a Mexican former professional baseball pitcher.

== Career ==
Cobos played in the Mexican League since 2005 for the Sultanes de Monterrey, Tuneros de San Luis, Pericos de Puebla, and Rojos del Águila de Veracruz.

In the Mexican Pacific League, he played for the Venados de Mazatlán, Cañeros de Los Mochis and Naranjeros de Hermosillo.

He also played for the Mexico national baseball team at the 2013 World Baseball Classic.
