= Matt Tupman =

American baseball player (born 1979)

- Catcher
- Born: November 25, 1979 (age 46); Concord, New Hampshire, U.S.
- Batted: Left Threw: Right

MLB debut
- May 18, 2008, for the Kansas City Royals

Last MLB appearance
- May 18, 2008, for the Kansas City Royals

MLB statistics
- Batting average: 1.000
- Home runs: 0
- Runs batted in: 0
- Stats at Baseball Reference

Teams
- Kansas City Royals (2008)

Matthew David Tupman (born November 25, 1979) is an American former professional baseball catcher.

Tupman is one of 125 players (as of the beginning of the 2026 MLB season) in MLB history with a 1.000 career batting average.

== Amateur career ==
Tupman played for Plymouth State University his freshman year before transferring to University of Massachusetts Lowell. He hit .414 his freshman year at Plymouth. He batted .363 with 8 home runs, 73 runs, 18 doubles and 50 RBIs his junior year and was named second-team a Division II All-American.

== Professional career ==
=== Kansas City Royals ===
Before the 2008 season, Tupman played in the Caribbean Series in the Dominican Republic. Tupman was called up by the Kansas City Royals on May 16, 2008, when John Buck was placed on the paternity list after his wife gave birth prematurely. Tupman made his major-league debut as a pinch hitter for Jimmy Gobble against the Florida Marlins on May 18. In the top of the ninth inning, Tupman recorded a hit off Kevin Gregg in his only plate appearance, then remained in the game as catcher for the final half-inning. The next day, Buck was activated from the paternity list and Tupman returned to the minor leagues.

Tupman became a free agent at the end of the 2008 season, and re-signed to a minor-league contract on November 30. On June 21, 2009, Tupman was released from the Royals organization.

=== Arizona Diamondbacks ===
On July 6, 2009, Tupman was signed to a minor league contract by the Arizona Diamondbacks. He was granted free agency at the end of the '09 season. He was suspended for violating Minor League Baseball's drug policy. It was his second positive test.

=== Lancaster Barnstormers ===
After spending 2010 out of baseball, in 2011, Tupman signed with the Lancaster Barnstormers of the Atlantic League of Professional Baseball. He played in 57 games he hit .268/.302/.380 with 4 home runs, 17 RBIs and 1 stolen base. He became a free agent following the season.
