= Luis Maza =

Venezuelan baseball player (born 1980)

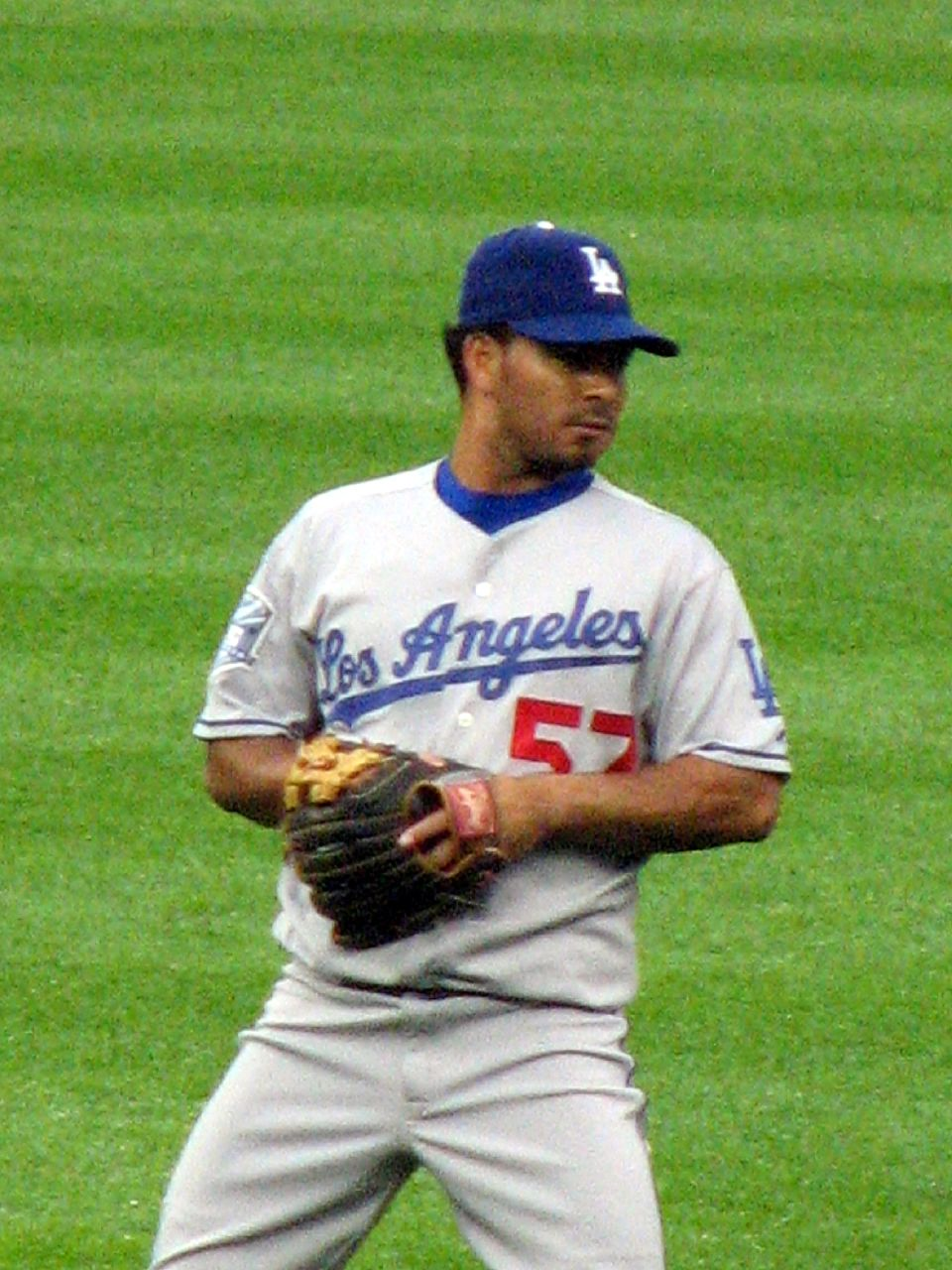

Pericos de Puebla
- Infielder / Coach
- Born: June 22, 1980 (age 45); Cumaná, Venezuela
- Batted: Right Threw: Right

MLB debut
- May 14, 2008, for the Los Angeles Dodgers

Last appearance
- July 18, 2008, for the Los Angeles Dodgers

MLB statistics
- Batting average: .228
- Home runs: 1
- Runs batted in: 4
- Stats at Baseball Reference

Teams
- Los Angeles Dodgers (2008)

Luis Alberto Maza Mayorca (born June 22, 1980) is a Venezuelan former professional baseball infielder, currently the first base coach of the Pericos de Puebla of the Mexican League. He played in Major League Baseball (MLB) for the Los Angeles Dodgers in 2008. Listed at 5'9", 180 lb., he bats and throws right-handed. Primarily a second baseman, Maza is a versatile player who can play at shortstop, third base, and left field.

== Playing career ==
=== Minnesota Twins ===
Maza was signed as an undrafted free agent by the Minnesota Twins on October 28, 1997, and started his professional career with the Gulf Coast League Twins in 1999. While in the minor leagues with the Twins organization, he also appeared for the Elizabethton Twins (2000), Quad Cities River Bandits (2001), Fort Myers Miracle (2002–2003), New Britain Rock Cats (2004–2005), and Rochester Red Wings (2004–2006).

=== Los Angeles Dodgers ===
A free agent after 2006, Maza signed with the Los Angeles Dodgers and split time between the Double-A Jacksonville Suns and Triple-A Las Vegas 51s. Through 2008, he was a .284 hitter with 525 runs and a .334 on-base percentage in 924 minor league games.

Maza hit .378 with Las Vegas and made his major league debut as a defensive replacement for the Dodgers in the ninth inning against the Milwaukee Brewers on May 14, 2008. He made his first start at shortstop the following day and went 1-for-3, getting his first career hit off Brewers starter Ben Sheets. In 45 games with the Dodgers in 2008, Maza hit .228.

In 2009, Maza spent the entire year with the Triple-A Albuquerque Isotopes. He hit .300 with 5 homers and 44 RBI. He was a utility player for Albuquerque. He played second, third, left, two innings in center, and got two outs as a pitcher in a blowout loss to the Round Rock Express on July 20.

=== Philadelphia Phillies ===
On January 25, 2010, Maza signed a minor league contract with the Philadelphia Phillies organization. He made 51 appearances for the Triple-A Lehigh Valley IronPigs, slashing .220/.289/.262 with 10 RBI and one stolen base.

=== Houston Astros ===
On June 25, 2010, Maza was traded to the Houston Astros. He played in 15 games for the Triple-A Round Rock Express, hitting .258/.361/.419 with one home run and four RBI. Maza was released by the Astros organization on August 6.

=== BBC Grosseto ===
In 2011, Maza signed one-year contract with BBC Grosseto of the Italian Baseball League.

== Coaching career ==
On February 19, 2025, Maza joined the Pericos de Puebla of the Mexican League as first base coach.

== Highlights ==
- Appalachian League All-Star (2000)
- Florida State League All-Star (2002)
- Caribbean Series All-Star (2008)

== See also ==
- List of Major League Baseball players from Venezuela
