= Buddy Bailey =

American baseball manager (1957–2025)

- Bailey managing the Tigres de Aragua in 2011
- Born: March 28, 1957; Norristown, Pennsylvania, U.S.
- Died: September 22, 2025 (aged 68); Lynchburg, Virginia, U.S.
- Batted: Right Threw: Right

MiLB managerial statistics
- Win–loss record: 2,228–2,095 (.515)
- Stats at Baseball Reference

Teams
- Pulaski Braves (1983–1984); Sumter Braves (1985; 1987); Durham Bulls (1986; 1988); Greenville Braves (1988–1990); Lynchburg Red Sox (1991–1992); Pawtucket Red Sox (1993–1996; 2002–2004); Daytona Cubs (2006; 2009–2011); Iowa Cubs (2007); Tennessee Smokies (2008; 2012–2015); Myrtle Beach Pelicans (2016–2018; 2021–2024); South Bend Cubs (2019)

Career highlights and awards
- 2× International League Manager of the Year (1996, 2003); Venezuelan Professional Baseball League Manager of the Year (2006–07)

Welby Sheldon "Buddy" Bailey (March 28, 1957 – September 22, 2025) was an American professional baseball manager and Major League coach with 45 years of experience in the game, 35 as a minor league manager.

Bailey was manager for the Myrtle Beach Pelicans of the Carolina League through the 2024 season. In 2016, his first season as manager of the Pelicans, he led the Pelicans to the league championship. Previously, in 2015, he had spent his fourth consecutive season and fifth year overall as manager of the Tennessee Smokies, the Cubs' Double-A Southern League affiliate. The veteran minor league pilot won his 1,500th game in May 2011 and exceeded the 2,000-win mark during 2016.

He was a longtime manager of the Tigres de Aragua of the Venezuelan Professional Baseball League (LVBP), leading the team to six championships (2004, 2005, 2007, 2008, 2009, and 2012), as well as the 2009 Caribbean Series title. He is the only manager in LVBP history to win six titles with a single team, and was behind only Regino Otero for most championships overall. He also won a record 500 games in the league, despite the LVBP's shortened winter league schedule of only around 56 games per regular season.

== Atlanta Braves organization ==
A graduate of Amherst County High School, Amherst, Virginia, and Lynchburg College, Bailey signed his first pro contract with the Atlanta Braves in 1979. A catcher, he threw and batted right-handed, stood 6 feet (1.83 m) tall and weighed 193 pounds (87.5 kg). Bailey never reached Major League Baseball as a player, hitting .210 with six home runs over four minor league seasons, mostly at the Class A level. He managed in the Atlanta organization from 1983 to 1990, winning the Southern League pennant as pilot of the Greenville Braves in 1988.

== Boston Red Sox organization ==
Bailey joined the Boston Red Sox as manager of their Class A Lynchburg Red Sox affiliate in the Carolina League in 1991–92. He then became the ninth manager in the history of the Triple-A Pawtucket Red Sox in 1993, the youngest manager in team history at the time. He would lead the "PawSox" for seven seasons, spread over two terms (1993–96; 2002–04). Under Bailey, the PawSox played for the 2003 Governors' Cup, the championship of the International League. They were defeated by the Durham Bulls. He won Manager of the Year twice in the IL, in 1996 and 2003, becoming one of only four managers to do that in league history.

Bailey also spent one season (2000) in the Major Leagues as the bench coach for the parent Red Sox and was Boston's advance scout, field coordinator of minor league instruction, or roving catching instructor during the period of 1997–99 and in 2001.

Bailey was the manager of Tigres de Aragua of the Venezuelan Professional Baseball League (LVBP) beginning in 2002 and collected six championships and two sub-championship in nine finals, while leading the Tigres to the 2009 Caribbean Series title. He also was named the LVBP Manager of the Year in the 2006–07 season.

== Chicago Cubs organization ==
Bailey initially joined the Cub system in 2006 as its roving minor league catching instructor, before assuming the managerial reins of the Daytona Cubs of the Class A Florida State League in the middle of that season. He then spent 2007 and 2008 as a manager in high classification leagues, including one year as manager of the Smokies. Bailey spent 2007 as pilot of the Iowa Cubs of the Triple-A Pacific Coast League, and finished second overall in the PCL American North Division standings with a 79–65 record. In 2008, his Smokies finished in last place in the SL's North Division with a mark of 62–77 (.446). He was replaced by Ryne Sandberg as Smokies' manager on December 17, 2008.

Bailey then returned to Daytona for the 2009–11 seasons. His 2011 Daytona Cubs finished 76–61 during the regular season and won the first-half championship of the Florida State League's Northern Division. The Cubs then won the FSL playoff championship, earning Bailey a promotion to his second term as manager of the Double-A Smokies for 2012. His 2012 club missed the SL playoffs (compiling a record of 72–68), but the 2013 edition finished 76–62, the best overall record in the Southern League North Division, to qualify for the postseason. The Smokies then fell to the eventual league champion Birmingham Barons in the first playoff round, three games to two.

His 2016 Pelicans won 82 of 139 games played (.590) during the regular Carolina League season, then defeated the Salem Red Sox and Lynchburg Hillcats in the playoffs to win the league title. Bailey was rehired for the 2017 season on December 16, 2016. In 2017, his Pelicans finished 73–67 and won their first-half division title, but fell in the first playoff round. Bailey was invited to return for 2018 and his third straight campaign with Myrtle Beach on January 18, 2018.

After spending the 2019 season with the Low-A South Bend Cubs, Bailey returned to managing the Pelicans for the 2021 season. He remained the club's manager through the 2024 season making 2 more playoff appearances. He was replaced by Yovanny Cuevas for the 2025 season.

== Death ==
Bailey died from cancer in Lynchburg, Virginia, on 22 September 2025, at the age of 68. Days before his death, he had been announced as manager of the Senadores de Caracas for the upcoming 2026 Venezuelan Major League season. At the time of his death, Ozzie Guillén said that Bailey was "without a doubt, the best manager to ever lead the Venezuelan Professional Baseball League."

Preceded by Russ Nixon	Greenville Braves manager 1988–1990	Succeeded by Chris Chambliss
Preceded by Rico Petrocelli; Gary Jones	Pawtucket Red Sox manager 1993–1996; 2002–2004	Succeeded by Ken Macha; Ron Johnson
Preceded by Grady Little	Boston Red Sox bench coach 2000	Succeeded by Dave Jauss
Preceded by Don Buford; Jody Davis	Daytona Cubs manager 2006; 2009–2011	Succeeded by Jody Davis; Brian Harper
Preceded by Mike Quade	Iowa Cubs manager 2007	Succeeded by Pat Listach
Preceded by Pat Listach; Brian Harper	Tennessee Smokies manager 2008; 2012–2015	Succeeded by Ryne Sandberg; Mark Johnson
Preceded by Mark Johnson	Myrtle Beach Pelicans manager 2016–2018	Succeeded by Steven Lerud
Preceded by Jimmy Gonzalez	South Bend Cubs manager 2019–2020	Succeeded by Michael Ryan
