= Luis Rodríguez (baseball) =

Venezuelan baseball player (born 1980)

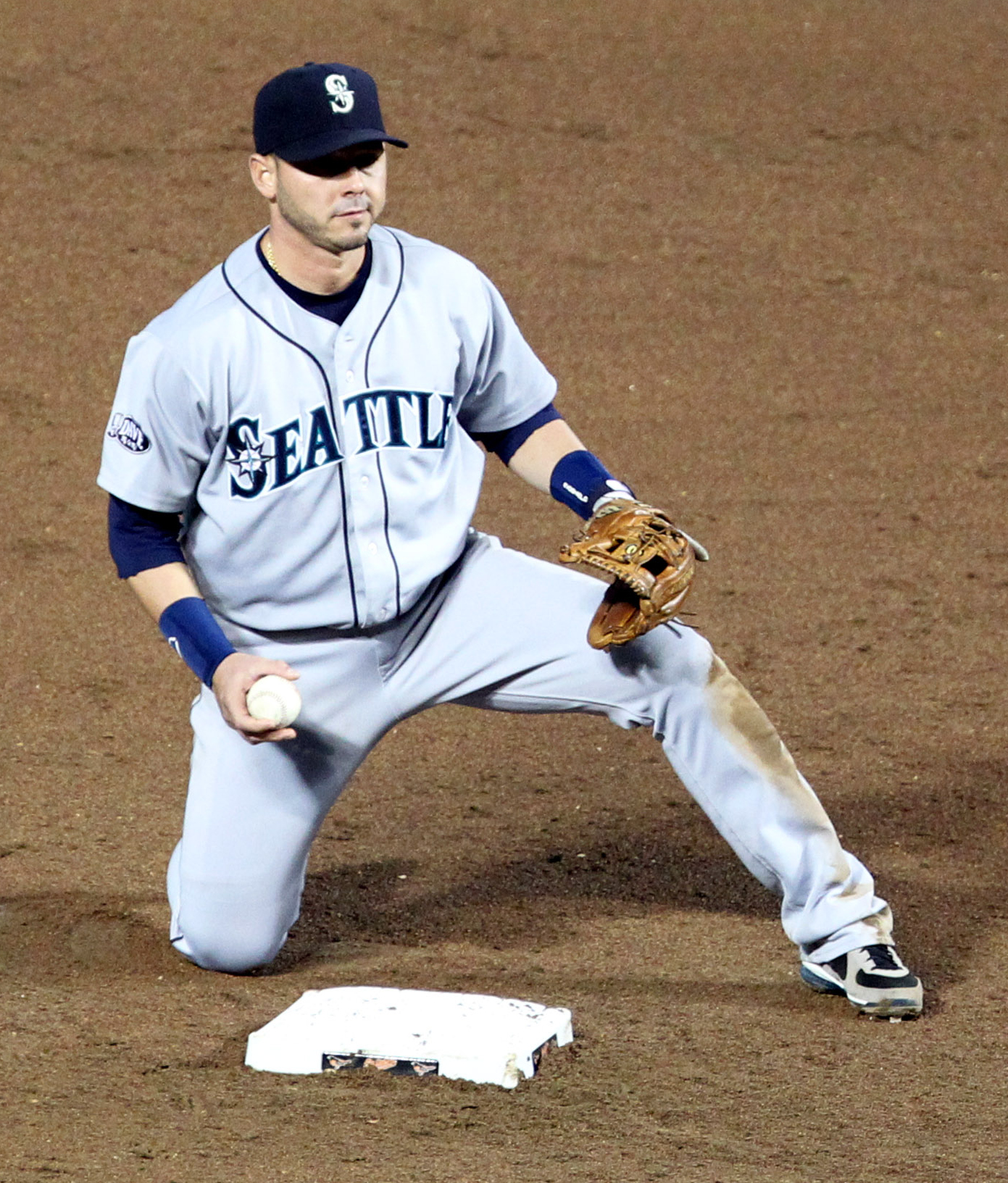
- Rodriguez with the Seattle Mariners
- Shortstop
- Born: June 27, 1980 (age 46); San Carlos, Cojedes, Venezuela
- Batted: Both Threw: Right

MLB debut
- May 21, 2005, for the Minnesota Twins

Last MLB appearance
- September 27, 2011, for the Seattle Mariners

MLB statistics
- Batting average: .238
- Home runs: 10
- Runs batted in: 80
- Stats at Baseball Reference

Teams
- Minnesota Twins (2005–2007); San Diego Padres (2008–2009); Seattle Mariners (2011)

Luis Orlando Rodríguez (born June 27, 1980) is a Venezuelan former professional baseball shortstop. He played in Major League Baseball (MLB) for the Minnesota Twins, San Diego Padres, and Seattle Mariners. He is a switch hitter and throws right-handed.

== Career ==
=== Minnesota Twins ===
Rodríguez made his major league debut with the Minnesota Twins on May 21, 2005. He was recalled from Triple-A Rochester to replace rookie Jason Bartlett, who won the starting job out of spring training, but began to have trouble at the plate. From 2003-2004, Rodríguez was the primary second baseman at Rochester, although he played a handful of games at third base and shortstop in 2004. With excellent plate discipline, he hit .295 and .286 respectively, with a combined .354 on-base percentage. When Rodríguez got the call, he was hitting .278 with a .339 OBP in 33 games. In 79 games for the Twins, he hit .269 with 2 home runs and 20 runs batted in. In 2006, Rodríguez split time between Rochester and Minnesota, with the Twins, and he was .235 in 59 games. Inspired by the "Rory Fitzpatrick for NHL All-Star" Campaign, Rodriguez was the subject of a similar campaign known as "Vote for L-Rod" which aimed to elect him to the 2007 MLB All-Star game as the American League's starting 3rd baseman. For the 2007 season, Rodríguez hit .219 in 68 games.

=== San Diego Padres ===
Rodriguez was claimed off waivers by the San Diego Padres on October 4, 2007. He made his Padres debut on July 5, 2008 after spending the first three months of 2008 with the PCL's Portland Beavers. In his first season with the Padres, Rodríguez hit a career high .287 in 64 games. The following season, Rodríguez set a career high in walks with 37 despite hitting a career low .202 for the Padres.

=== Cleveland Indians ===
On December 2, 2009, Rodriguez, signed a minor league contract with the Cleveland Indians with an invite to Spring Training.

=== Chicago White Sox ===
On April 29, 2010, Rodriguez signed with the Chicago White Sox and was assigned to the Triple-A Charlotte Knights. Rodríguez spent the entirety of the season in Triple-A.

=== Seattle Mariners ===
On November 22, 2010, Rodríguez signed a minor league contract with the Seattle Mariners organization. In 2011, he played in only 10 games split between the Low-A Everett AquaSox and Triple-A Tacoma Rainiers. On November 2, 2011, Rodríguez was removed from the 40-man roster and sent outright to Tacoma; he subsequently rejected the assignment and elected free agency.

On November 23, 2011, Rodríguez re-signed with Seattle on a new minor league contract that included an invitation to spring training.

=== Los Angeles Angels of Anaheim ===
Rodríguez spent the 2013 season with the Salt Lake Bees, the Los Angeles Angels' Triple-A affiliate.

=== Bridgeport Bluefish ===
Rodríguez signed with the Bridgeport Bluefish of the Atlantic League of Professional Baseball for the 2015 season.

== See also ==
- List of Major League Baseball players from Venezuela
