= Rafael Álvarez (baseball) =

Spanish baseball player (born 1977)

- Outfielder
- Born: Rafael Ángel Álvarez Flores; 22 January 1977 (age 49); Valencia, Carabobo, Venezuela
- Bats: Left Throws: Left
- Stats at Baseball Reference

Rafael Ángel Álvarez Flores (born 22 January 1977) is a baseball coach and former professional player who coaches the Spain national team and played as an outfielder and first baseman. Born in Venezuela, he represented Spain internationally.

== Career ==
Álvarez played in the Minnesota Twins farm system from 1994 through 2000. Afterwards, he played in the Mexican League and several Minor League circuits from 2001 to 2011.

In between, Álvarez played winter ball with six different clubs of the Venezuelan League between the 1994–95 and 2013–14 seasons, most prominently for the Tiburones de La Guaira during nine seasons spanning 1994-95/2013-14, being part of two pennant winners and a Caribbean Series championship in its 2006 edition.

== International career ==
Álvarez was a member of the Spain national team in the 2013 World Baseball Classic.
