= Walter Silva =

Mexican baseball player (born 1977)

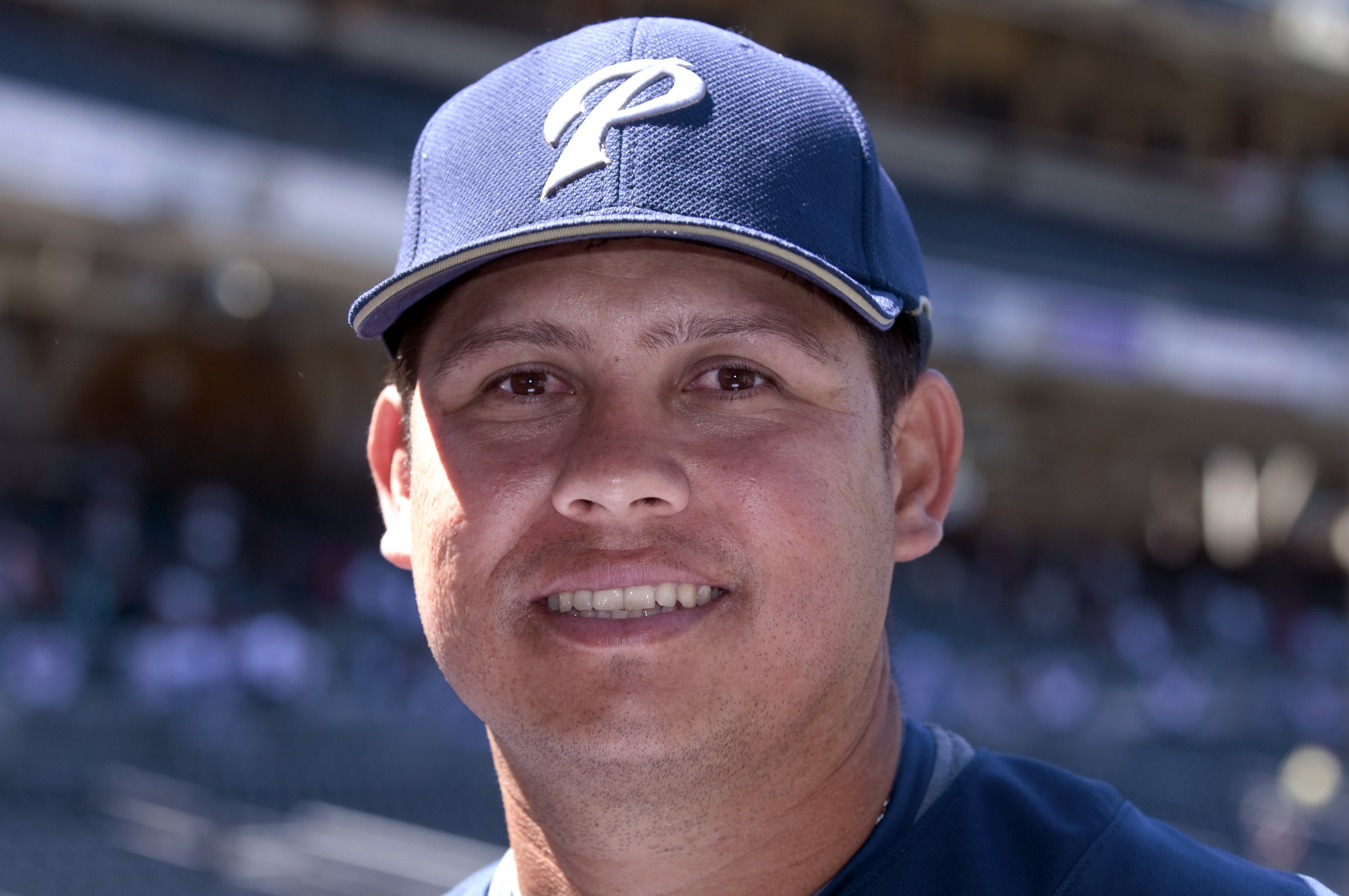
- Silva with the San Diego Padres

Free agent
- Pitcher
- Born: January 4, 1977 (age 49); Mazatlan, Sinaloa, Mexico
- Batted: Right Threw: Right

Professional debut
- CPBL: March 20, 2005, for the La New Bears
- MLB: April 8, 2009, for the San Diego Padres

Last appearance
- CPBL: May 5, 2005, for the La New Bears
- MLB: July 6, 2009, for the San Diego Padres

CPBL statistics
- Win–loss record: 1–5
- Earned run average: 4.78
- Strikeouts: 27

MLB statistics
- Win–loss record: 0–2
- Earned run average: 8.76
- Strikeouts: 11
- Stats at Baseball Reference

Teams
- La New Bears (2005); San Diego Padres (2009)
Medals
Men's baseball
Representing Mexico
Central American and Caribbean Games
Bronze medal – third place	2006 Cartagena	Team

Walter Silva (born January 4, 1977) is a Mexican professional baseball pitcher who is a free agent. He has previously played in Major League Baseball (MLB) for the San Diego Padres and in the Chinese Professional Baseball League (CPBL) for the La New Bears.

== Career ==
=== Mexican League/San Diego Padres ===
Silva played in the Mexican League from 2002 to 2008.

In 2005, he pitched in the Chinese Professional Baseball League for the La New Bears.

On February 21, 2009, Silva was invited to spring training by the San Diego Padres. After a good spring he made the Opening Day roster as the team's third starter in the pitching rotation. Silva made his Major League debut on April 8, against the Los Angeles Dodgers. He pitched five innings allowing two runs on five hits with a strikeout, and earned the no decision, leaving the game tied at 2–2. Silva was the starting pitcher for the visiting Padres in the first Major League baseball game at the New York Mets' new ballpark, Citi Field, April 13. He pitched 4 2/3 innings, giving up five runs on five hits, and striking out two. The Padres won the game, but Silva did not get the decision. On July 7, he was designated for assignment by the Padres after going 0–2 with an 8.76 ERA in 6 starts.

=== Sultanes de Monterrey ===
In 2010, Silva returned to the Mexican League with the Sultanes de Monterrey, for whom he played for through the 2015 season.

=== Vaqueros Laguna ===
On April 12, 2016, Silva was traded to the Vaqueros Laguna from the Toros de Tijuana. In 18 starts for Laguna, he posted a 6-4 record and 3.91 ERA with 47 strikeouts across 92 innings of work.

=== Bravos de León ===
On March 18, 2017, Silva was traded to the Bravos de León.

Silva did not play in a game in 2020 due to the cancellation of the Mexican League season because of the COVID-19 pandemic. He was released by the Bravos on March 9, 2021.

=== Generales de Durango ===
On June 11, 2021, Silva signed with the Generales de Durango of the Mexican League. In 8 games (7 starts) for Durango, he struggled to an 0-5 record and 9.11 ERA with 11 strikeouts across 27 2/3 innings pitched. Silva was released by the Generales on November 23.

== International career ==
Silva represented Mexico at the 2003 Baseball World Cup, appearing in three games, against United States, Brazil and Japan, suffering defeats against the United States and Brazil.

After the 2020 season, he played for Panama in the 2021 Caribbean Series.
