= Edgar Gonzalez (infielder) =

American baseball player (born 1978)

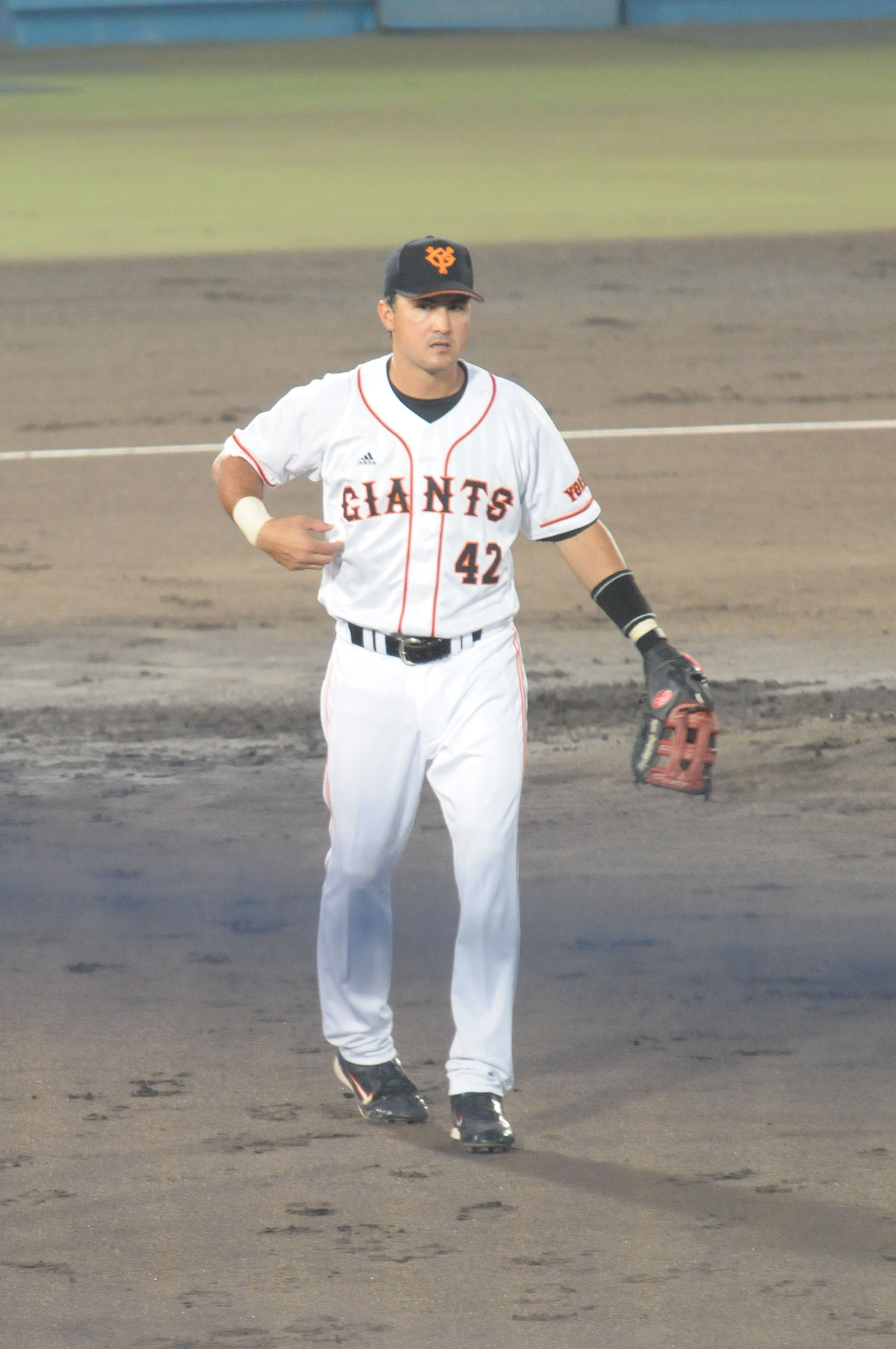
- Gonzalez with the Yomiuri Giants
- Second baseman
- Born: June 14, 1978 (age 48); San Diego, California, U.S.
- Batted: Right Threw: Right

Professional debut
- MLB: May 12, 2008, for the San Diego Padres
- NPB: March 26, 2010, for the Yomiuri Giants

Last appearance
- MLB: October 4, 2009, for the San Diego Padres
- NPB: October 1, 2012, for the Yomiuri Giants

MLB statistics
- Batting average: .255
- Home runs: 11
- Runs batted in: 51

NPB statistics
- Batting average: .253
- Home runs: 16
- Runs batted in: 19
- Stats at Baseball Reference

Teams
- San Diego Padres (2008–2009); Yomiuri Giants (2010, 2012)

Career highlights and awards
- Japan Series champion (2012)

Edgar Gonzalez (born June 14, 1978) is an American former professional baseball second baseman. He played in Major League Baseball (MLB) for the San Diego Padres and in Nippon Professional Baseball (NPB) for the Yomiuri Giants.

== Professional career ==
=== Tampa Bay Devil Rays ===
In 2000 Gonzalez batted .270 with seven doubles, seven triples, 16 RBIs and nine stolen bases in a combined 61 games with the Rookie-Level Princeton Devil Rays and the short-season Hudson Valley Renegades.

Gonzalez led the New York–Penn League in 2001 in total bases with 146, and hits with 92. He was second in batting average and games, third in slugging percentage, fourth in runs and extra-base hits and fifth in doubles. He played 73 games in '01.

He played a career-high 134 games with the Class-A Charleston RiverDogs in 2002. 128 of those games at third base with just one game played at second base. He finished the season hitting .275 with 123 hits, 28 doubles, eight home runs and 62 RBIs in 447 at bats

Playing mostly at third base, Gonzalez spent the 2003 season with the Class-A Advanced Bakersfield Blaze. He had a 12-game hitting streak from July 20 to August 12 in which he hit .340 with seven RBIs. In 100 games he hit .298 with 32 doubles, six home runs and 62 RBIs.

=== Texas Rangers ===
On December 15, 2003 Gonzalez was drafted by the Texas Rangers from the Tampa Bay Devil Rays in the 2003 Rule 5 draft. Gonzalez saw his first action at Double-A in 2004, playing with the Frisco RoughRiders of the Texas League in 2004. He put together a 16-game hitting streak from May 4–20, boosting his batting average from .190 to .327 during that stretch. He batted .299 with five homers and 26 RBIs in 52 home games.

=== Washington Nationals ===
Gonzalez was drafted by the Washington Nationals from the Texas Rangers in the 2004 Rule 5 draft, making it the second time he was chosen by a team from the draft. He opened the 2005 season at the Double-A Harrisburg Senators and played 101 games at Double-A before an August promotion to the Triple-A New Orleans Zephyrs. He picked up his first hit at Triple-A on August 16 against the Omaha Royals.

On March 31, 2006 Gonzalez was released by the Washington Nationals.

=== Florida Marlins ===
After signing with Florida on April 4, Gonzalez opened the season with the Class-A Advanced Jupiter Hammerheads. He was promoted to the Double-A Carolina Mudcats after hitting .293 with Jupiter. He had hits in 18 of his first 24 games at Carolina, batting .341 in May. He hit at a .349 clip out of the second slot in the line-up while with Carolina. He was transferred to the Triple-A Albuquerque Isotopes on July 19. He picked up his first hit on July 21 at New Orleans and continued with a 10-game hitting streak that lasted through August 1. Gonzalez hit .392 during his 46 games at Triple-A.

=== St. Louis Cardinals ===
On January 30, 2007 Gonzalez signed as a Free Agent with the St. Louis Cardinals. He spent the entire '07 season with the Triple-A Memphis Redbirds of the Pacific Coast League batting .308 with 34 doubles, eight home runs, 53 RBIs and 15 stolen bases in 126 games.

=== San Diego Padres ===
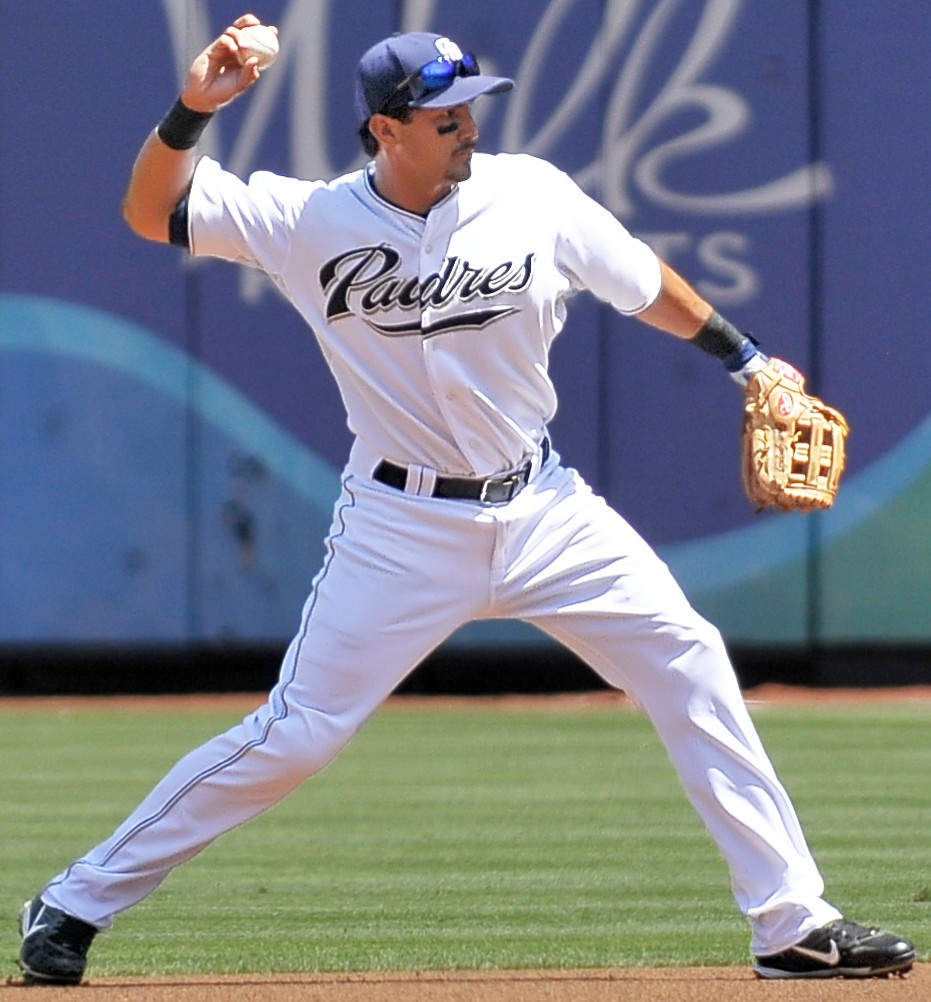
Gonzalez with the San Diego Padres in 2008

Gonzalez made his Major League debut in May, 2008 and spent the remainder of the season with San Diego. He joined his younger brother Adrian on the Major League club, becoming the sixth set of brothers in club history and fourth pair to play together. He finished among National League rookie leaders in batting average, home runs, RBI, multiple-hit games, runs, hits, total bases, doubles, walks, on-base percentage, slugging percentage and extra-base hits. He made 72 appearances at second base, 66 starts, four at third base, two starts, three at shortstop, one start, two in left field, one start, and three in right field, one start. Gonzalez posted a .984 fielding percentage overall, making five errors in 310 total chances. His contract purchased from the Triple-A Portland Beavers on May 12 and he made his Major League debut that night against the Chicago Cubs, collecting his first hit, an RBI single. He was only the sixth player in franchise history with an RBI hit in first career plate appearance and first since Kevin Higgins in 1993. Gonzalez made his debut at 29 years, 333 days old making him the second oldest player to make his debut for the Padres, the first being Akinori Otsuka at 32 years, 84 days old. Nine June doubles tied him for second in the National League during the month in that category.

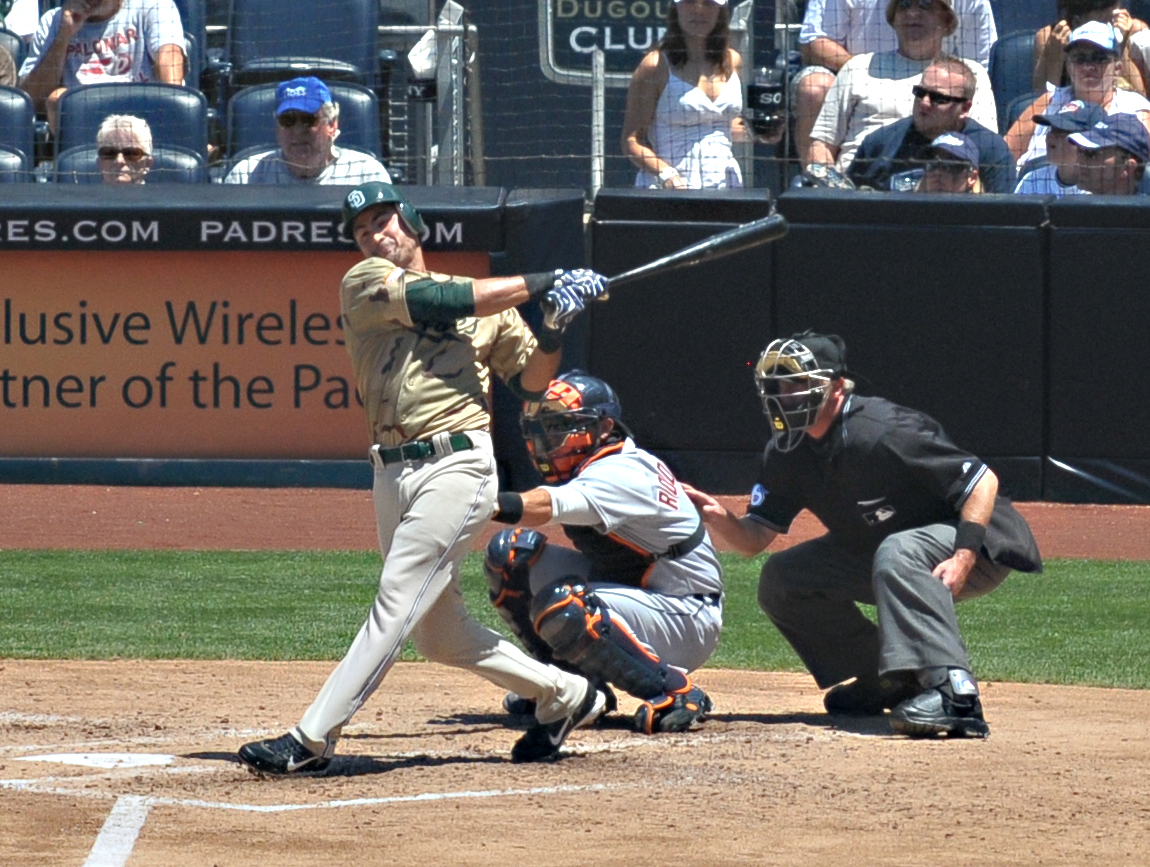
Gonzalez at bat

In 2009 Gonzalez failed to follow up his superb rookie season. He hit .216 with 33 hits, eight doubles, two triples, four home runs and 18 RBIs. On July 18, he was struck in the head by a fastball from Colorado Rockies' pitcher Jason Hammel. This caused Gonzalez to miss seven weeks with concussion-like symptoms.

=== Yomiuri Giants ===
On January 8, 2010, Gonzalez signed with the Yomiuri Giants of the Nippon Professional Baseball (NPB).

=== San Francisco Giants ===
On February 10, 2011, the San Francisco Giants signed Gonzalez to a minor league contract. The deal did not include an invite to spring training.

=== Chicago Cubs ===
Gonzalez signed a minor league contract with the Chicago Cubs on January 6, 2012. He became a free agent after the 2014 season.

=== Coaching career ===
Gonzalez was named as the manager for the GCL Yankees for the 2019 season.

== International career ==
Gonzalez selected for the Mexico national baseball team in the 2009 World Baseball Classic and 2013 World Baseball Classic.

Gonzalez managed the Mexico national baseball team in the 2017 World Baseball Classic Qualification in 2016, 2016 exhibition series against Japan, and 2017 World Baseball Classic in 2017.

== Personal life ==
Gonzalez is the older brother of first baseman Adrián González, who last played in MLB for the New York Mets and the younger brother of David Gonzalez. Their father was a member of the Mexico national baseball team. He married Ana Cristina Lujan Gonzalez in 2003. He has two children, Arianna Gonzalez and Edgar Alexander Gonzalez. Arianna was born on August 11, 2012, and her little brother, Alexander, was born on October 14, 2014.
