= Iván Maldonado =

Puerto Rican-American baseball pitcher (born 1980)

Free Agent
- Pitcher
- Born: June 7, 1980 (age 46); New York City, New York, U.S.
- Bats: Right Throws: Right
- Stats at Baseball Reference
Medals
Men's baseball
Representing Puerto Rico
Pan American Games
Gold medal – first place	2019 Lima	Team
Central American and Caribbean Games
Gold medal – first place	2018 Barranquilla	Team

Iván Maldonado Oquendo (born June 7, 1980) is a Puerto Rican-American baseball pitcher who is free agent.

== Career ==
Maldonado was drafted by the New York Mets in the 18th round of the 2002 MLB draft.

Maldonado was signed by the Long Island Ducks, an independent team on April 9, 2010.

After the 2020 season, he played for Criollos de Caguas of the Liga de Béisbol Profesional Roberto Clemente(LBPRC). He has also played for Puerto Rico in the 2021 Caribbean Series.

== International career ==
He also was a member of the Puerto Rico team in the 2006 World Baseball Classic, 2009 World Baseball Classic, 2018 Central American and Caribbean Games and 2019 Pan American Games.
