= Willie Collazo =

Puerto Rican baseball player (born 1979)

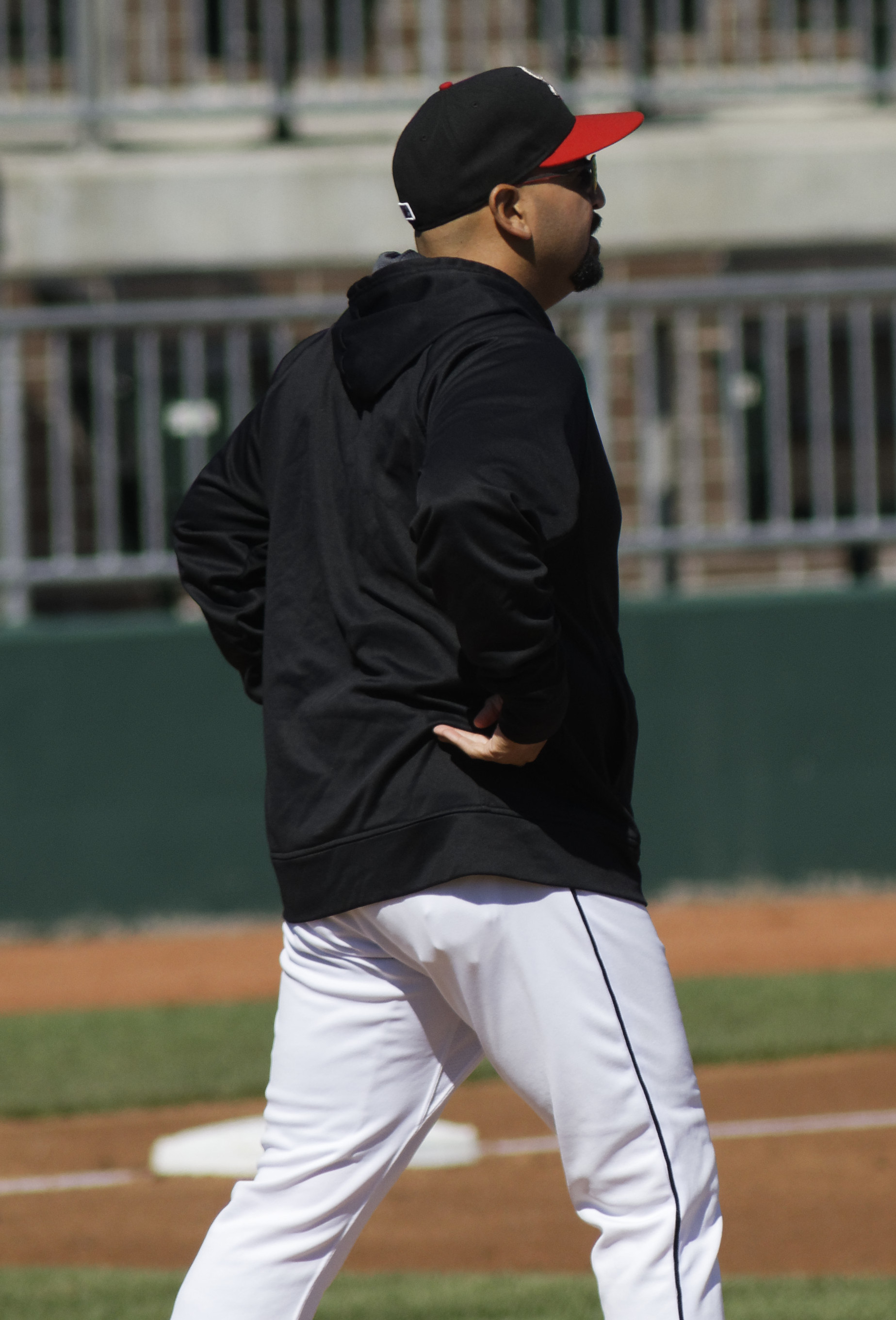
- Collazo with the Lansing Lugnuts in 2017
- Pitcher / Coach
- Born: November 7, 1979 (age 46); Carolina, Puerto Rico
- Batted: Left Threw: Left

MLB debut
- September 5, 2007, for the New York Mets

Last MLB appearance
- September 29, 2007, for the New York Mets

MLB statistics
- Win–loss record: 0-0
- Earned run average: 6.35
- Strikeouts: 0
- Stats at Baseball Reference

Teams
- New York Mets (2007)

William Collazo [koy-yah'-zo] (born November 7, 1979) is a Puerto Rican former professional baseball pitcher. During the 2007 season, he appeared in six games for the New York Mets of Major League Baseball (MLB). Since 2016, Collazo has worked as a minor league pitching coach in the Toronto Blue Jays organization.

== Playing career ==
Collazo graduated from Florida International University, where he went 13–1 as a senior and helped his team to the NCAA Division I Baseball Championship tournament. He was drafted by the Atlanta Braves in the 10th round of the 2001 Major League Baseball draft. Collazo played for the Braves, Los Angeles Angels, and New York Mets organizations. He was called up to the Mets on September 1, 2007, and made his major league debut on September 5, 2007, against the Cincinnati Reds. He became a free agent at the end of the 2008 season and signed a minor league contract with the Florida Marlins.

On January 13, 2010, Collazo signed a minor league contract with the Toronto Blue Jays. He played in the Blue Jays organization from 2010 to 2012. Collazo was the pitching coach for the Low-A Vancouver Canadians in 2016. On January 19, 2017, he was promoted to be the pitching coach for the Single-A Lansing Lugnuts.

== Coaching career ==
In July 2019, Collazo was named the pitching coach at FIU.

He was let go by FIU after the 2022 season.

== See also ==
- List of Major League Baseball players from Puerto Rico
