= Oneli Pérez =

Dominican professional baseball player (born 1983)

Free agent
- Pitcher
- Born: May 26, 1983 (age 43); Bonao, Dominican Republic
- Bats: Right Throws: Right
- Stats at Baseball Reference

Teams
- Hanwha Eagles (2011)

Oneli M. Pérez Garcia (born May 26, 1983) is a Dominican professional baseball player.

== Biography ==
Pérez was born in Bonao, Dominican Republic.

He was undrafted and was signed by the Chicago White Sox as a free agent on May 19, 2004, by fellow Dominican Denny González.

In January 2011, he accepted an offer to play with Hanwha Eagles in the Korea Baseball Organization, but was released in June later that year. Since then, he joined the Mexican team Sultanes de Monterrey on a recommendation from his former Hanhwa team-mate Karim García who had previously spent a short spell at the team.
