= Víctor Moreno =

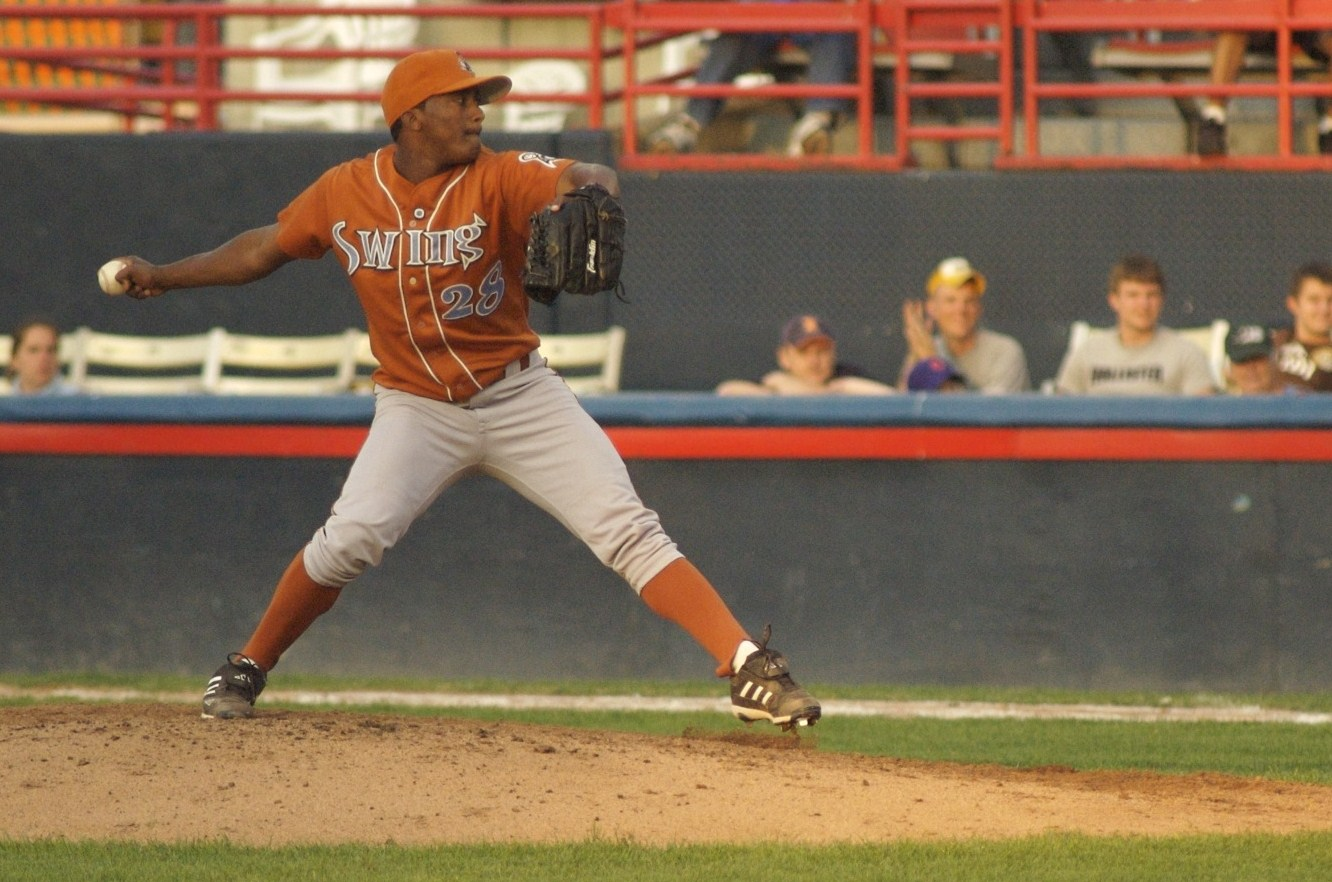
- Pitcher
- Born: June 10, 1979 (age 47); Puerto Cabello, Carabobo, Venezuela
- Bats: Right Throws: Right
- Stats at Baseball Reference

Víctor Hugo Moreno (born June 10, 1979) is a Venezuelan former professional baseball player. He was a set-up relief pitcher who batted and threw right-handed. He was signed by the Arizona Diamondbacks as a non-drafted free agent September 5, 1997.

Moreno played minor league baseball for the Diamondbacks, Philadelphia Phillies, Minnesota Twins, Los Angeles Angels of Anaheim and Oakland Athletics systems, before joining the Baltimore Orioles as a non-roster invitee to 2007 spring training.

== Professional career ==
=== Arizona Diamondbacks ===
He went 4-6 with two saves and a 3.75 ERA in 50 1/3 innings pitched in the Dominican Summer League in 1998.

In 1999 Moreno went 1-4 with a 4.04 ERA in 42 1/3 innings pitched in the Dominican Summer League. He went 1-2 with two saves and a 9.90 ERA in 10 innings in the Arizona League.

Moreno went 5-2 with two saves and a 2.40 ERA in 71 1/3 innings in the Venezuelan Summer League in 2000, marking his last season with the Diamondbacks.

=== Philadelphia Phillies ===
He went 4-2 with a 1.69 ERA in 26 2/3 innings pitched in the Gulf Coast League in 2001.

In 2002 he went 3-3 with five saves and a 3.71 ERA in 26 2/3 innings for the Class-A Batavia Muckdogs. Moreno went 1-0 with one save in 10 scoreless innings for the Class-A Lakewood BlueClaws.

=== Minnesota Twins ===
Moreno went 3-1 with a 2.03 ERA in 26 2/3 innings for the Class-A Advanced Fort Myers Miracle. He went 1-1 with a 6.95 ERA in 33 2/3 innings for the Double-A New Britain Rock Cats in 2003.

He went 1-0 with a 6.35 ERA in 11 1/3 innings for Triple-A Rochester Red Wings and also went 7-2 with two saves and a 2.27 ERA in 75 1/3 innings for Double-A New Britain in 2004.

=== Oakland Athletics ===
Moreno went 4-2 with two saves and a 4.50 ERA in 74 innings for the Triple-A Sacramento River Cats in 2005 and in 2006, again playing for the River Cats he went 5-4 with four saves a 5.38 ERA in 100 1/3 innings.

=== Baltimore Orioles ===
Moreno played for the Norfolk Tides in 2007 going 2-5 with a 5.06 ERA in 36 games, one for a start.

In a seven-season minor-league career, Moreno has posted a 31-21 record with a 4.20 ERA and 18 saves in 237 appearances.

=== Mexican Leagues ===
Moreno played for the Diablos Rojos del Mexico in 2008 and for the Piratas de Campeche in 2009 of the Mexican League before his release.

=== World Baseball Classic ===
Moreno also was a member of the Venezuela national team during the 2006 and 2009 World Baseball Classic.
