= Iván Blanco (baseball) =

Venezuelan baseball player

- Pitcher
- Born: September 24, 1983 (age 43); Caracas, Venezuela
- Bats: Right Throws: Right
- Stats at Baseball Reference

Iván Blanco (born September 24, 1983 in Caracas, Venezuela) is a Venezuelan former professional baseball pitcher.

== Career ==
Blanco signed as an undrafted free agent with the Seattle Mariners in 2000. He represented Venezuela national baseball team in the 2009 World Baseball Classic.
