= History of Puerto Rico Islanders FC =

Professional association football team based in Bayamón, Puerto Rico

This articles details the History of the Puerto Rico Islanders. The Puerto Rico Islanders were a professional association football team based in Bayamón, Puerto Rico. Founded in 2003, the team played in the North American Soccer League (NASL), the second tier of the American soccer pyramid.

== USISL ==
In 1995, a team called the Puerto Rico Islanders joined the USISL, now the United Soccer Leagues (USL), was founded by Joe Serralta, his wife Rosa Serralta and his son Joey Serralta prompted by Joey Serralta's proposal to his father while Joey Serralta was playing in the USISL with the Charlotte Eagles in 1994 of starting a professional soccer team in the USISL in his homeland. The team played only 7 games before the Serralta family decided to move the franchise to Houston, Texas on June 1, changing its name to the Houston Force, due to problems with the Puerto Rican Football Federation. In 1996, Joey Serralta would become the owner and president of the Houston Hurricanes F.C. while Joe Serralta, Sr. would bring the Islanders back to the island to play on a local basis.

== Early years (2003-2005) ==
Eight year after Serralta's first attempt at professional football, he gave it another go and together with a group of Puerto Rican businessmen officially created the current incarnation of the Puerto Rico Islanders. The team played their first A-League season, now the USL First Division, in 2004. The original squad was composed of a large number of local Puerto Rican players and a contingency of foreign players composed of Americans, Brazilians, Salvadoran and Argentines completed this first squad, the team was coached by Brazilian Vitor Hugo Barros who was replaced several games into the season by Argentine Hugo Hernán Maradona, brother of the legendary Diego Armando Maradona. The team played its first league game on April 17, 2004 against the Toronto Lynx at the Juan Ramon Loubriel Stadium, the Islanders lost 1–0 in front of a reported 6,000 fans. The Islanders had their first victory on January 15, 2004 against the Charleston Battery with a score of 1–0 at the Juan Ramon Loubriel Stadium. Led by players like Mauricio Salles, Raúl Díaz Arce and Luis Fernando Zuleta Mechura the Islanders finished the 2004 season in 14th place, with a record of 5 wins, 17 losses and 6 ties.

In 2005, the Islanders still under Hugo Hernán Maradona brought in a new group of players that would become staples in the club for the next couple of seasons (Petter Villegas, Marco Vélez, Dan Kennedy, Caleb Norkus, Alejandro González Pareja and Noah Delgado), and retained several key players like Mauricio Salles. At the end of the season, the Islanders had an improved season record with 10 wins, 10 losses and 8 ties, this time barely missing the playoff.

== 2006 season ==
The Islanders opened their 2006 season with a mix of new players like Argentine Gustavo Barros-Schelotto, Chilean Arturo Norambuena, Canadian Alen Marcina, and homegrown talent Marco Vélez, Alexis Rivera, Rafael Ortiz Huertas, and American Dan Kennedy to create one of the strongest lineups in the club's short history, in a serious attempt to take the USL Div. 1 title for the first time.

Formed under the management of then head coach Jorge Alvial, the 2006 Islanders had a record of 3-2-1 up to early June, when Alvial put in his resignation to become a scout for the English club Chelsea. The club lumbered across the last half of the season barely making the playoffs, under the new head coach Toribio Rojas, Jorge Alvial's assistant coach, finishing the season in 6th place and with a record of 10-8-10.

In the weekend before the 2006 playoffs, the Islanders hosted Miami FC twice, who had Brazilians Romário and Zinho in their line up. The Islanders needed four points to qualify for the Playoffs. After going down 0:2 in the first half the Islanders managed to come back and win 4:2 in front of 8,600.

In the final game of the season against Miami on September 10, 2006, they attracted a record crowd of nearly 11,000 fans. Early in the second half Miami took the lead. It wasn't until the 43rd minute of the second half that the Islanders equalized with an Arturo Norambuena penalty. A draw was sufficient for the Islanders to qualify in front of Seattle and Atlanta.

In the first round of the playoffs, the team played a home-away series against the Charleston Battery. Unfortunately for the Islanders, Charleston won the series 3:2, ending the 2006 season for the Puerto Ricans.

== 2007 season ==
The team came into the season on a high, they had just played a preseason tournament against MLS teams and achieved very successful results. They also had signed several dangerous players like Panamanian trio Victor Herrera, a Panamanian international, Gustavo Avila, and Alberto Zapata, a new goalkeeper Josh Saunders, rookie Jay Needham The Force folded after one game in Houston., plus a return of players like Marco Vélez, Petter Villegas and Noah Delgado. The squad was considered serious contenders for the title.

After one early success, the team took a turn for the worse. It was evident that Toribio Rojas had lost his edge and after an embarrassing 2:1 lost against bottom table Minnesota Thunder was let go from his coaching position and given the post of Youth System Director, when he left the team with a record of 1-3-3. Also attendance went down.

The FO quickly found a replacement in ex-FC Dallas coach Colin Clarke, who had found himself without a job after the debacle of the Virginia Beach Mariners. He immediately established himself as a hard and hotheaded coach. Because of the way he conducted the team's practice, he was given the nickname of "El General", because he worked the team like a general would with his troops.

The rapid change was also seen on the field, in the first game under Clark the team beat the Minnesota Thunder 2:1, just a week after it had lost against them. Clark and the Islanders turned around, even with some bad roster decisions by Clark in American Jared Montz and Jamaican Gregory Simmonds, he redeemed himself by signing players like Haitian Fabrice Noel, Englishman Taiwo Atieno and bringing Willie Sims on loan from the New England Revolution. These players had a positive impact on the squad and the team ended comfortably in 6th place, two spots on top of the last playoff spot.

The Islanders went into the playoffs with an air of confidence but facing powerhouse Montreal, passing the quarterfinals seemed very difficult. After a 2:3 loss in Montreal, the team came back at home with the 3:0 victory, winning the series 5:3. In the semifinals, the team faced the same problem but now against regular season champions Seattle Sounders. The Islanders lost at home but managed to tie the series in Seattle, losing the series 4–2 in penalties.

== 2008 season ==
On June 16, 2008, Jonathan Steele was included in the USL's "All-Star Week Players" list. On June 27, 2008, the Islanders defeated the Minnesota Thunder with a score of 1–0. Two days later, they won the second game of the series 3–1. The Islanders began gaining more points in the second half of June and early July, earning a total of 24 points, positioning themselves in the second position of the league's global standing. On July 18, 2008, the Islanders defeated the Carolina RailHawks, reaching the second place of the league's standings. On July 27, 2008, the team closed a road trip with a 3–2 victory against Minnesota Thunder, securing their position. On August 8, 2008, the Islanders defeated Rochester Rhinos four goals to none. This victory placed the team in the top of the league's standing for the first time in the club's history. After tying with Rochester two days later, the team shared the position with the Vancouver Whitecaps. In the final stages of the tournament, the Islanders regained the first position and on September 19, they won the first Commissioner's Cup since their creation, clinching the first place in the league's regular season. The Puerto Rico Islanders became the first team of the USL league to win 4 individual honors from a total of 5; this includes Goalkeeper of the Year (Bill Gaudette), Most Valuable Player (Jonathan Steele), Defense of the Year (Cristian Arrieta) and Head Coach of the Year (Colin "General" Clarke). Islanders would go on to the USL 1 Division final in Vancouver and lose to the Whitecaps 2:1, in the team's first final.
