= Puerto Rico Islanders records and statistics =

Puerto Rico Islanders is a Puerto Rican professional soccer team.

This article contains historical and current statistics and records pertaining to the club.

All stats are accurate as of match played February 26, 2009.

== Recent seasons ==
Season	League	Pos.	Pl.	W	D	L	GS	GA	P	Playoffs	CFU		CONCACAF				Manager
2004	USL A-League	9, Eastern	28	5	6	17	22	48	21	Did not qualify	CFUCC	Did not participate	CCC	Did not participate			(Brazil) Vitor Hugo Barros & (Argentina) Hugo Maradona
2005	USL First Division	7	28	10	8	10	46	43	38	Did not qualify	CFUCC	Did not participate	CCC	Did not participate			(Argentina) Hugo Maradona
2006	USL First Division	6	28	10	8	10	38	36	38	Quarter-Final	CFUCC	Group Stage	CCC	Did not participate			(Chile) Jorge Alvial & (Costa Rica) Toribio Rojas
2007	USL First Division	6	28	10	10	8	35	34	40	Semi-Final	CFUCC	3rd place	CCC	Did not qualify			(Costa Rica) Toribio Rojas & (Northern Ireland) Colin Clarke
2008	USL First Division	1	30	15	9	6	43	23	54	Runner Up	CFUCC	3rd place	CCC	Did not qualify	CCL	Semi-Finals	(Northern Ireland) Colin Clarke
2009	USL First Division	3	30	15	8	7	44	31	53	Semi-Final	CFUCC	Runner Up	CCL	Group Stage			(Northern Ireland) Colin Clarke
2010	USSF Division 2 Pro League	8, Overall;5, USL	30	9	10	11	37	35	37	Champions	CFUCC	Champions	CCL	Group Stage			(Northern Ireland) Colin Clarke

Color:

Gold	Winner
Silver	Runners-Up
Bronze	3rd place/Semi-final

=== Statistics in USSF Division 2 Professional League ===
- Seasons in USSF Division 2: 1
- First game in USSF Division 2: PRI 3 - NSC Minnesota Stars 1 (April 21, 2010)
- Longest consecutive wins in League matches: 2 (April 21, 2010 - April 24, 2010)
- Longest unbeaten run in League matches:
- Longest unbeaten run at home in league matches:
- Longest unbeaten run in away league matches:
- Longest winning run in the League (home):
- Longest winning run in the League (away):
- Most goals scored in a match: PRI 4 - Miami FC 2 (June 2, 2010)
- Most goals conceded in a match: Rochester Rhinos 3 - PRI 0 (June 26, 2010)
- Largest attendance in a league playoff game:

=== Statistics in USL First Division ===
- Seasons in USL First Division: 6
- First game in USL First Division: Toronto Lynx 1 - PRI 0 (April 17, 2004)
- Best position in USL First Division: 1 (2008)
- Worst position in USL First Division: 9, Eastern (2004)
- Longest consecutive wins in USL First Division:
- Longest unbeaten run in League matches: 12 (6 wins, 6 ties) (Aug 3 - Sep 21, 2008)
- Longest unbeaten run at home in league matches: 10 (7 wins, 3 ties) (Jun 3 - Sep 16, 2007)
- Longest unbeaten run in away league matches: 10 (7 wins, 3 ties) (Jul 6 - Sep 12)
- Longest winning run in the League (home): 5 (July 22 - Sep 16, 2007)
- Longest winning run in the League (away):5 (Jul 6 - 27, 2008)
- Most goals scored in a season: 46 (2005)
- Most goals scored in a match: PRI 4 - Rochester Rhinos 0 (2008-08-08)
- Most goals conceded in a match: Portland Timbers 5 - PRI 0 (2004)
- Most wins in a league season: 15 (2008)
- Most draws in a league season: 10 (2007)
- Most defeats in a league season: 17 (2004)
- Fewest wins in a league season: 5 (2004)
- Fewest draws in a league season: 6 (2004)
- Fewest defeats in a league season: 6 (2008)
- Largest attendance in a league playoff game: 12,098 (2007)

=== Statistics in CFU Club Championship ===
- First game in CFUCC: PRI 3 - Hoppers FC 1 (12/9/2006)
- Most goals scored in a match: PRI 10 - Sap FC 0 (11/6/2007)
- Most goals conceded in a match: PRI 2 - Harbor View FC 2 (11/4/2007)

=== Statistics in CONCACAF Champions League ===
- First game in the CCL: PRI 1 - LD Alajuelense 1 (8/27/2008)
- Longest unbeaten run in the CCL matches: 4 (Aug 27 - Sep 23, 2008)
- Most goals scored in a match: PRI 4 - Los Angeles Galaxy 1 (7/28/2010)
- Largest attendance in the CCL: 12,993 (8/4/2010)

=== Historical goals ===
- 1st Goal: Mauricio Salles (April 29, 2004), PRI 1 - 2 Syracuse Salty Dogs

== Goalscorer records ==
=== All-time goalscorer ===
Rank	Name	Career	Goals
1	(Brazil) Mauricio Salles	2004 - 2005	25
2	(Haiti) Fabrice Noel	2007 - 2009	22
3	(United States) (Puerto Rico) Noah Delgado	2005 - current	17
4	(Italy) (United States) (Puerto Rico) Cristian Arrieta	2008 - 2009	17
5	(Canada) Alen Marcina	2006 - 2007	16
6	(Ecuador) (United States) (Puerto Rico) Petter Villegas	2005 - 2009	15
7	(England) Taiwo Atieno	2007 - 2008	13

== Appearance records ==
=== All-Time Appearance Leaders ===
Rank	Name	Career	Apps
1	(United States) (Puerto Rico) Noah Delgado	2005 - current	129
2	(Ecuador) (United States) (Puerto Rico) Petter Villegas	2005 - current	107
3	(Puerto Rico) Alexis Rivera Curet	2004 - current	106
4	(El Salvador) (United States) Edwin Miranda	2006 - 2008;2010 - current	94
5	(Puerto Rico) Marco Vélez	2005 - 2007; 2009 - current	87
6	(Puerto Rico) Raphel Ortiz Huertas	2004 - 2008	74

== Minutes records ==
=== All-Time Minutes Leaders ===
Rank	Name	Career	Min
1	(United States) (Puerto Rico) Noah Delgado	2005 - current	9319
2	(Puerto Rico) Marco Vélez	2005 - 2007; 2009 - current	7699
3	(Puerto Rico) Alexis Rivera Curet	2004 - current	7333
4	(El Salvador) (United States) Edwin Miranda	2006 - current	7179
5	(Ecuador) (United States) (Puerto Rico) Petter Villegas	2005 - current	7076
