= Javier Alvial =

American and Chilean footballer (born 1992)

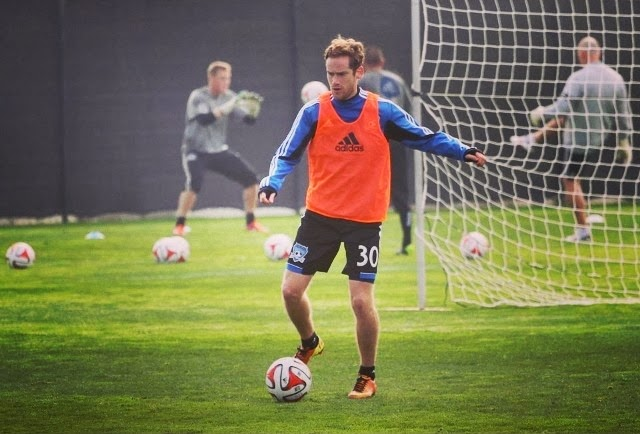

Personal information
- Full name: Javier Andrés Alvial
- Date of birth: January 12, 1992 (age 34)
- Place of birth: Fairfax, Virginia, U.S.
- Height: 5 ft 11 in (1.80 m)
- Positions: Center midfielder; left midfielder

Youth career
- 2005: Atlanta United
- 2005–2006: Universidad de Chile
- 2006: Universidad Católica
- 2006: Colo-Colo
- 2007: Academia Ernesto Duchini
- 2007–2009: Defensor Sporting
- 2007: Concorde Fire
- 2007–2008: Chelsea
- 2007: Municipal Iquique
- Atlanta Fire United

Senior career*
Years	Team	Apps	(Gls)
2006	Puerto Rico Islanders		
- FC Dallas
2012	Atlanta Silverbacks		
2013	San Luis		

International career
2007	United States U17		
- * Club domestic league appearances and goals

Javier Andrés Alvial (born January 12, 1992) is an American retired and Chilean professional footballer who last played for San Luis de Quillota in Chile. He is currently working as the scouting and recruitment manager for the Portland Timbers in MLS.

== Career ==
=== Youth ===
Alvial has been all over the world in his youth career. Playing in several top youth clubs such as Club Deportivo Universidad Católica in Chile, Club Atlético River Plate in Argentina, Defensor Sporting in Uruguay, Chivas USA in United States, Chelsea F.C. in England, etc.

It has been said that Alvial played in these clubs for a year or less in El Gráfico. In an interview translated from Spanish to English, he states "because of my fathers job, I always had to be travelling from place to place which is why I could not stay in one club".

He then played for University of Alabama at Birmingham for a few months, but withdrew from the team in half season to pursue his dream of becoming a professional soccer player.

=== Professional ===
Alvial's first professional experience was with Puerto Rico Islanders at the age of 14, when well-known players such as Arturo Norambuena and Gustavo Barros Schelotto were playing. His other professional experiences were with Deportes Iquique, and Major League Soccer's Columbus Crew, and FC Dallas.

Alvial's last professional club was in 2013, playing for San Luis de Quillota in Quillota, Chile.

== Personal life ==
Son of Jorge Alvial, Javier Alvial grew up in many different places outside of the United States such as Chile, Argentina, Uruguay, and Puerto Rico. In the states, he grew up in Georgia, Florida, and Virginia. He's the youngest out of the two older siblings he has.
