= List of presidential trips made by Bill Clinton (1996) =

This is a list of presidential trips made by Bill Clinton during 1996, the fourth year of his presidency as the 42nd president of the United States. International trips are highlighted in blue.

This list excludes trips made within Washington, D.C., the U.S. federal capital in which the White House, the official residence and principal workplace of the president, is located. It also excludes the capital's immediate surroundings in Maryland and Virginia, such as Andrews Air Force Base in Maryland, where the president typically boards Air Force One for all trips outside the area. Also excluded are trips to Camp David, the country residence of the president.

== January ==
State or country	Areas visited	Dates	Details
South Carolina	Hilton Head	December 31–January 1	Holiday vacation.
Maryland	Annapolis	January 4	Attended the funeral of Admiral Arleigh Burke at the United States Naval Academy Cemetery.
Tennessee	Nashville	January 11–12	Toured a Peterbilt truck factory. Attended a Democratic luncheon at the Opryland Hotel.
Italy	Aviano Air Base	January 13	Met with U.S. military personnel.
Hungary	Taszár	January 13	Met with U.S. military personnel.
Bosnia and Herzegovina	Tuzla	January 13	Met with President Alija Izetbegovic. Addressed U.S. military personnel.
Croatia	Zagreb	January 13	Met with President Franjo Tudjman.
Georgia	Atlanta	January 15	Attended a Martin Luther King Jr. Day service at Ebenezer Baptist Church. Toured the construction site of Centennial Olympic Stadium.
Texas	Houston	January 20	Attended the funeral of former Representative Barbara Jordan at Good Hope Missionary Baptist Church. Met the Space Shuttle crew of STS-72 as they arrived at Ellington Field Joint Reserve Base.
Kentucky	Louisville	January 24	Participated in a roundtable discussion on community policing at a local police station. Spoke at Louisville Male High School.

== February ==
State or country	Areas visited	Dates	Details
New Hampshire	Manchester, Concord, Nashua, Salem, Bedford, Merrimack	February 2–3	Spoke at the Capitol Center for the Arts and Walker Elementary School in Concord. Toured the Lockheed Sanders plant in Nashua, where he participated in a roundtable discussion on the school-to-work transition. Spoke at Salem High School, St. Cecilia's social hall in Manchester. Participated in a roundtable discussion on small business at the New Hampshire Hydraulics Co. plant in Merrimack.
Iowa	Cedar Rapids, Iowa City, Clear Lake, Mason City, Des Moines	February 10–11	Spoke at Carver–Hawkeye Arena and North Iowa Area Community College. Toured a grain elevator at the Farmers' Co-op Society in Clear Lake. Participated in a roundtable discussion on the work-study program at Drake University's Knapp Center.
Oregon	Portland	February 14	Surveyed damage from the 1996 Pacific Northwest floods at Tom McCall Waterfront Park.
Washington	Woodland	February 14	Surveyed damage from the 1996 Pacific Northwest floods.
Idaho	Boise	February 14	Surveyed damage from the 1996 Pacific Northwest floods.
New Jersey	Newark, Union City	February 14–15	Participated in a roundtable discussion on education technology at Christopher Columbus Junior High School, and spoke about the subject at St. Michael's Academy, both in Union City.
New York	New York	February 15	Attended a Democratic dinner at the Sheraton New York Times Square Hotel.
New Jersey	East Rutherford, Newark	February 15–16	Stayed at the Sheraton Meadowlands Hotel.
Pennsylvania	Scranton, Wilkes-Barre	February 16	Surveyed damage from flooding caused by the January 1996 United States blizzard. Spoke at the King's College Chapel of Christ the King and at its gymnasium.
New Hampshire	Portsmouth, Rochester, Keene, Manchester, Nashua	February 17	Spoke at the Rochester Community Center gymnasium, Keene central square, and the New Hampshire College gymnasium. Attended a Democratic dinner at the Sheraton Tara Hotel in Nashua.
California	Long Beach, Santa Monica, Los Alamitos	February 23–24	Spoke about the Boeing C-17 Globemaster III at a McDonnell Douglas plant in Long Beach, where he also met with members of the crew closing down the Long Beach Naval Shipyard. Held a summit with Japanese prime minister Ryutaro Hashimoto at the Miramar Sheraton Hotel. Participated in a roundtable discussion on school uniforms at Jackie Robinson Academy in Long Beach.
Washington	Shoreline	February 24	Participated in a roundtable discussion on worker retraining at Shoreline Community College's automotive training center, then spoke in the college's gymnasium.

== March ==
State or country	Areas visited	Dates	Details
Michigan	Taylor, Detroit	March 4	Spoke at the Taylor Department of Public Works building. Attended a Democratic luncheon at the Cobo Conference/Exhibition Center.
California	Los Angeles, Malibu, Concord, Hillsborough	March 8–9	Toured a Harman International assembly plant in Van Nuys. Observed NetDay by helping to install computer cabling at Ygnacio Valley High School.
New Jersey	Hackensack, Wallington	March 11	Spoke at Fairleigh Dickinson University's Rothman Center Auditorium. Toured the Industrial Latex Corp. Superfund site.
New York	New York	March 11	Received Irish America magazine's Irish-American of the Year award at the Plaza Hotel. Attended a DCCC dinner at the St. Regis New York rooftop garden.
Egypt	Sharm el-Sheikh	March 13	Attended the Summit of the Peacemakers.
Israel	Jerusalem, Tel Aviv	March 13–14	Discussed cooperation against terrorism with senior Israeli officials.
Louisiana	New Orleans, Leesville, Alexandria	March 18	Spoke at the dedication of the Nashville Avenue B Wharf at the Port of New Orleans. At Fort Polk, met with families of servicemembers serving in Operation Joint Endeavor. Attended the annual musical performance of Messiah at the United Pentecostal Church.
Ohio	Cincinnati, Columbus	March 23	Participated in a roundtable discussion on corporate mentoring at Xavier University's Schmidt Hall and spoke at Schmidt Memorial Field House. Attended a DNC dinner at the Ohio State Fairgrounds' Lausche Building.
New York	Palisades	March 27	Attended the National Governors Association Education Summit at the IBM Palisades Executive Conference Center.

== April ==
State or country	Areas visited	Dates	Details
Maryland	Baltimore	April 2	Threw out one of the ceremonial first pitches on Major League Baseball Opening Day at Oriole Park at Camden Yards.
Oklahoma	Oklahoma City, Edmond	April 5	Attended the dedication of a YMCA day care center replacing the one destroyed in the Oklahoma City bombing the previous year. Met with families of the bombing victims at the Myriad Convention Center. Spoke at the University of Central Oklahoma School of Education.
Delaware	Dover	April 6	Met with families of those killed in the 1996 United States Air Force Boeing T-43 crash, which had included Clinton's commerce secretary Ron Brown, at Dover Air Force Base.
Maryland	Baltimore, Owings Mills	April 10	Attended a DNC reception at Mayor Kurt Schmoke's home, followed by a dinner at Caves Valley Golf Club.
Alaska	Anchorage	April 14–15	Stopover at Elmendorf Air Force Base on the way to South Korea.
South Korea	Cheju Island	April 15–16	Met with President Kim Young-sam. Proposed four-nation peace talks.
Japan	Tokyo	April 16–18	State visit. Issued joint statement on U.S.-Japanese security relations. Addressed the Diet and U.S. Navy personnel.
Russia	Saint Petersburg, Moscow	April 18–21	Attended the G-7 summit on nuclear safety. Summit Meeting with President Boris Yeltsin.
Delaware	Wilmington	April 26	Attended the Senate Democratic Issues Conference at the Hotel duPont.
Pennsylvania	Philadelphia	April 26	Attended a Democratic reception at the Franklin Institute, followed by dinner at Philadelphia City Hall.
Florida	Coral Gables	April 29	Spoke about the updated National Drug Control Strategy at George Washington Carver Middle School. Attended a Democratic dinner at the Miami Biltmore Hotel.

== May ==
State or country	Areas visited	Dates	Details
New Jersey	Woodbridge, New Vernon, Jersey City	May 7	Observed the Kick Butts Day anti-smoking campaign during a visit to Woodbridge High School. Attended a Democratic dinner at Communipaw Terminal.
Pennsylvania	State College	May 10	Gave the commencement address at Penn State Graduate School at the Bryce Jordan Center.
Missouri	Webster Groves, St. Louis	May 17	Spoke at the Webster Groves High School gymnasium. Campaigned for Representative Dick Gephardt at the Trans World Dome.
Connecticut	New London	May 22	Gave the commencement address at the United States Coast Guard Academy, where he toured the USCGC Eagle (WIX-327).
New York	New York	May 22	Addressed Fleet Week participants at the Intrepid Museum, where he received the museum's U.S.S. Intrepid Freedom Award.
Connecticut	Stamford	May 22	Attended a Democratic dinner at the Marriott hotel.
Wisconsin	Milwaukee	May 22–23	Hosted German chancellor Helmut Kohl at Milwaukee City Hall. Spoke at Pere Marquette Park.
Louisiana	New Orleans, Baton Rouge	May 30	Addressed the Women's International Convention of the Church of God in Christ at Ernest N. Morial Convention Center. Addressed a joint session of the Louisiana State Legislature at the State Capitol. Spoke at the Pentagon Barracks. Attended a reception at the Louisiana Governor's Mansion.

== June ==
State or country	Areas visited	Dates	Details
New Jersey	Princeton	June 4	Gave the commencement address at Princeton University's Nassau Hall.
Nevada	Las Vegas	June 9	Participated in a roundtable discussion on juvenile crime at the University of Nevada, Las Vegas student union ballroom.
California	San Francisco, San Diego, Los Angeles, Culver City, Santa Monica, Glendale	June 9–11	Spoke at the Presidio of San Francisco. Attended a DNC dinner at the home of Senator Dianne Feinstein in San Francisco. Spoke at San Diego Police Department headquarters and toured a satellite police office in Hillcrest. Attended a Saxophone Club reception at Smashbox Studios in Culver City. Spoke at Glendale Community College.
New Mexico	Albuquerque	June 11	Spoke at Grover Cleveland Middle School.
South Carolina	Charleston, Greeleyville	June 11–12	Attended the dedication ceremony of Mount Zion AME Church in Greeleyville, which had just been rebuilt after being burned down by arsonists the previous year.
Illinois	Chicago	June 21	Addressed the American Federation of State, County and Municipal Employees convention at McCormick Place.
Texas	Houston	June 21–22	Attended a DNC dinner at the JW Marriott hotel.
Ohio	Cleveland	June 22	Addressed the United States Conference of Mayors convention at the Renaissance Cleveland Hotel.
Tennessee	Nashville	June 24	Addressed the Family Re-Union conference at the Tennessee Performing Arts Center's James K. Polk Theater.
New York	New York	June 24	Attended a DNC reception at the Waldorf Astoria New York and dinner at the Plaza Hotel.
France	Lyon, Pérouges, Paris	June 27–29	Attended the 22nd G7 summit. Met with Russian prime minister Viktor Chernomyrdin and UN secretary-general Boutros Boutros-Ghali.

== July ==
State or country	Areas visited	Dates	Details
Illinois	Chicago	July 2	Addressed the National Council of Senior Citizens convention at the Hyatt Regency Chicago. Campaigned for Representative Dick Durbin at the Sheraton hotel. Attended the Chicago '96 dinner at the Navy Pier Grand Ballroom.
Maryland	St. Mary's County	July 4	Spoke about conservation of the bald eagle at Goose Creek Bridge at Naval Air Station Patuxent River.
Ohio	Youngstown	July 4	Celebrated Independence Day at Riverfront Park.
North Carolina	Charlotte	July 10	Addressed the NAACP convention at Charlotte Convention Center. Spoke at the Central Piedmont Community College.
Georgia	Atlanta	July 19	Toured the Olympic Village at Georgia Tech, then attended the 1996 Summer Olympics opening ceremony at Centennial Olympic Stadium, where he officially opened the Olympic Games. Visited the Georgia Governor's Mansion, where he recorded a radio address.
Colorado	Denver, Englewood	July 21	Attended a Saxophone Club reception at the Wings Over the Rockies Air and Space Museum. Spoke at the Temple Hoyne Buell Theatre. Attended an attended an "At the Table" meeting concerning women's issues and a DNC dinner at private residences in Denver. Attended another DNC reception and dinner at a private residence in Englewood.
California	Monrovia, Santa Monica, Beverly Hills, Brentwood, Los Angeles, Sacramento, San Francisco	July 22–24	Spoke at Monrovia High School. Visited the Miramar Sheraton Hotel. Attended the Asian-American Democratic Dinner at the Century Plaza Hotel. Attended DNC dinners at The Beverly Hilton and at a private residence in Brentwood. Spoke at the Women Escaping A Violent Environment Counseling Center in Sacramento. Visited McClellan Air Force Base, which was planned for closure. Attended a Democratic dinner at the Hilton San Francisco Union Square.
New York	New York	July 25	At John F. Kennedy International Airport, met with officials leading recovery efforts after the TWA Flight 800 disaster and spoke about measures to improve aviation safety.
Georgia	Atlanta	July 25	Attended events at the 1996 Summer Olympics.
Louisiana	New Orleans	July 28	Addressed the Disabled American Veterans convention at the Hilton New Orleans Riverside, where he also attended a private political reception.

== August ==
State or country	Areas visited	Dates	Details
California	San Jose, Salinas, Los Angeles, Santa Monica	August 7–9	Spoke at John Muir Middle School in San Jose, at the Monterey County Courthouse, at the Navy Mole pier at the Port of Long Beach. Attended a Saxophone Club reception at the Hammer Museum.
Wyoming	Jackson, Park County	August 9–17	Summer vacation. Visited Yellowstone National Park, where on August 12 he announced an agreement to acquire the New World Mining District area and add it to Gallatin National Forest. On the last day of the trip, a Lockheed C-130 Hercules carrying some of the president's luggage crashed into Sheep Mountain, killing eight Air Force crew members and a Secret Service agent.
Idaho	Idaho Falls	August 17	Spoke at Fanning Field.
New York	New York	August 18	Celebrated his 50th birthday with a reception at the Sheraton New York Times Square Hotel, a gala at Radio City Music Hall, and dinner at the Waldorf Astoria.
Tennessee	Fruitland, Jackson	August 19	Attended the dedication of Salem Missionary Baptist Church, which had been rebuilt after being burned down by arsonists the previous year. Spoke at McKellar-Sipes Regional Airport.
West Virginia	Huntington	August 25	Began a whistle-stop train tour, traveling to the 1996 Democratic National Convention aboard the "21st Century Express". Spoke at the former Chesapeake and Ohio Railway depot before boarding the train
Kentucky	Ashland	August 25	Spoke at Riverfront Park while traveling aboard the "21st Century Express".
Ohio	Chillicothe, Columbus, Arlington, Bowling Green, Toledo	August 25–26	Spoke from aboard the "21st Century Express" in Chillicothe and Bowling Green, as well as at the Columbus Police Academy, Arlington Community Park, Promenade Park in Toledo, and the Toledo Complex.
Michigan	Wyandotte, Royal Oak, East Lansing, Battle Creek, Kalamazoo	August 27–28	Traveling aboard the "21st Century Express". Spoke at the Bacon Memorial Public Library in Wyandotte, downtown Royal Oak, the Pontiac Transportation Center, Michigan State University's West Holden Hall, the Battle Creek station, and Merrill Park in Kalamazoo.
Indiana	Michigan City	August 28	Final stop on the "21st Century Express" whistle-stop train tour, speaking at the Old Michigan City Light.
Illinois	Chicago	August 28–30	Spoke at the University of Chicago baseball field. At the United Center, accepted the unanimous nomination of the 1996 Democratic National Convention to be the party's nominee in the 1996 United States presidential election. Attended further sessions of the convention at the Sheraton hotel.
Missouri	Cape Girardeau	August 30	First stop on a campaign bus tour, speaking at Capaha Park.
Illinois	Cairo	August 30	Spoke at the Stafford Public Library.
Kentucky	La Center, Paducah, Mayfield, Fulton	August 30–31	Gave campaign speeches along a bus tour, including at Harbor Plaza in Paducah and the town square in Fulton.
Tennessee	Troy, Dyersburg, Covington, Memphis	August 31	Gave campaign speeches along a bus tour, including at the courthouse square in Dyersburg and concluding at City Hall Plaza in Memphis. Campaigned for Harold Ford Jr. for Congress at the Holiday Inn Crowne Plaza in Memphis.

== September ==
State or country	Areas visited	Dates	Details
Arkansas	Little Rock	September 1–2	Spoke at the Old State House. Attended a National Baptist Association of America breakfast at the Excelsior Hotel.
Wisconsin	De Pere, Green Bay, Milwaukee	September 2	Spoke at Voyageur Park in De Pere. Visited the Green Bay Packers at Lambeau Field. Observed Labor Day at Labor Fest at Henry Maier Festival Park in Milwaukee.
Florida	Tampa, Miami, Bal Harbour, Orlando, Panama City	September 5–6	Spoke at Hillsborough High School and the Sunrise Musical Theater. Addressed the National Baptist Convention at the Orange County Convention Center. Spoke at the Valencia Community College gymnasium. Campaigned for Representative Pete Peterson at Gulf Coast Community College's Student Union East Building.
Missouri	Kansas City, St. Louis	September 10	Participated in a roundtable discussion on the Personal Responsibility and Work Opportunity Reconciliation Act of 1996 at the Full Employment Council office in Kansas City. Attended a DNC luncheon at the Westin Crown Center hotel. Addressed the Southern Governors' Association at the Country Club Plaza Ritz-Carlton hotel. Spoke at the Samuel Shepard Jr. Gateway Educational Park in St. Louis. Attended a DNC dinner at the Hyatt hotel in St. Louis.
Colorado	Pueblo	September 10–11	Stayed at the Ramada Inn. Spoke at the Pueblo County Courthouse.
Arizona	Sun City	September 11	Spoke at the Sun Dial Recreation Center.
California	Mountain View, Fresno, Rancho Cucamonga, Beverly Hills	September 11–13	Attended a DNC dinner at a private residence in Mountain View. Spoke at Morris E. Dailey Elementary School in Fresno and at Chaffey College. Attended a Democratic dinner at Ronald Burkle's home in Beverly Hills.
North Carolina	Raleigh	September 14	Surveyed damage from Hurricane Fran and spoke at the North Carolina State Fairgrounds.
Iowa	Des Moines, Norwalk, Indianola	September 15	Attended a reception at a private residence in Norwalk. Campaigned for Senator Tom Harkin at the Memorial Balloon Field.
Ohio	Cincinnati	September 16	Spoke at Cincinnati Music Hall.
Michigan	Ypsilanti, Westland	September 17	Toured the William D. Ford Career Technical Center in Ypsilanti. Spoke at John Glenn High School.
Illinois	Flossmoor	September 17–18	Spoke at Homewood-Flossmoor High School.
Arizona	Coconino County	September 18	Established the Grand Staircase–Escalante National Monument in a signing ceremony at El Tovar Hotel in Grand Canyon National Park.
Washington	Seattle, Tacoma, Yelm, Centralia, Longview, Woodland, Vancouver	September 18–19	Spoke at Pike Place Market. Attended a Saxophone Club reception at the Paramount Theatre. Conducted a campaign bus tour, speaking along the way at the Tacoma Dome, Yelm City Park, downtown Centralia, Sacajawea Park in Longview, Horseshoe Park in Woodland, and Fort Vancouver National Historic Site.
Oregon	Portland	September 19–20	Concluded a campaign bus tour with a stop at Lownsdale Square. Campaigned for Tom Bruggere for Senate at the Oregon Museum of Science and Industry.
South Dakota	Brandon	September 20	Spoke at Brandon Valley High School.
New York	New York	September 24	Attended the opening of the 51st United Nations General Assembly at United Nations Headquarters.
New Jersey	Freehold Borough	September 24	Spoke at the Monmouth County Courthouse.
Pennsylvania	Coraopolis, Philadelphia	September 25	Spoke at the Robert Morris College gymnasium. Attended a DNC reception at The Warwick, followed by dinner at the Locust Club in Philadelphia.
Texas	Longview, Fort Worth, Houston	September 27–28	Spoke in downtown Longview and at Sundance Square. Met the Space Shuttle crew of STS-79 as they returned to Ellington Field. Spoke at Sam Houston Park. Attended a DNC reception at a private residence in Houston.
Rhode Island	Providence	September 28	Spoke at Station Park. Campaigned for Representative Jack Reed for Senate at the Westin Providence.
Massachusetts	Fall River, Boston	September 28	Spoke at Kennedy Park. Attended a DNC reception at Le Méridien Boston. Campaigned for Senator John Kerry at the FleetCenter.

== October ==
State or country	Areas visited	Dates	Details
New York	Buffalo, Chautauqua	October 3–6	Spoke at Greater Buffalo International Airport. Prepared for the presidential debates at the Chautauqua Institution, with former senator George J. Mitchell playing the role of Clinton's opponent Bob Dole in a series of mock debates.
Connecticut	Hartford, Stamford	October 6–7	Held a campaign rally at the Hastings Hotel in Hartford. Participated in the first 1996 presidential debate against Bob Dole at The Bushnell Center for the Performing Arts. After the debate, held a campaign rally at Hartford Union Station. Spoke to business leaders at the Rich Forum.
New Hampshire	Manchester	October 7	Spoke at Gill Stadium.
Maine	Portland	October 7	Spoke at Hadlock Field.
Tennessee	Knoxville	October 10	Spoke at the Knoxville Civic Coliseum.
Ohio	Dayton	October 10	Spoke at the Old Montgomery County Courthouse Square.
Kentucky	Louisville	October 10	Spoke at the Louisville Slugger Museum & Factory.
Colorado	Denver, Morrison, Englewood	October 12–13	Spoke at Red Rocks Amphitheatre.
New Mexico	Albuquerque	October 13–16	Spoke in front of the KiMo Theater. Prepared for the second presidential debate while staying at the Pyramid Hotel, where he also signed the Wildfire Suppression Aircraft Transfer Act.
California	San Diego, Santa Ana, Los Angeles	October 16–17	Participated in the second presidential debate at the University of San Diego's Shiley Theater. Spoke at the Spreckels Organ Pavilion and at the Old Orange County Courthouse.
New Jersey	Newark, Teaneck	October 20	Spoke at the New Hope Baptist Church. Campaigned for Representative Robert Torricelli for Senate at the Marriott at Glenpointe Hotel.
New York	Tarrytown, New York	October 20	Attended a Presidential Unity Fund reception at a private residence in Tarrytown, and at the Sheraton New York.
Ohio	Parma	October 20–21	Spoke at Cuyahoga Community College.
Michigan	Detroit	October 21–22	Attended the groundbreaking ceremony for an expansion at Detroit Metropolitan Wayne County Airport. Addressed the United Michigan Clergy at the Cobo Center. Spoke at the Fisher Theatre.
Florida	Miami, Daytona Beach	October 22–23	Spoke at the Miami-Dade Community College North Campus. Attended a DNC dinner at the Miami Biltmore Hotel. Spoke in downtown Daytona Beach.
Alabama	Birmingham	October 24	Spoke at Birmingham–Southern College.
Louisiana	Lake Charles, Marrero	October 24–25	Spoke at the Northrop Grumman Aircraft Maintenance and Fabrication Center in Lake Charles, and at the Marrero Action Playground.
Georgia	Atlanta, Macon	October 25	Spoke at Woodruff Park. Addressed religious leaders at Paschal's. Spoke in downtown Macon.
Tennessee	Nashville	October 27	Spoke at Vanderbilt University's Langford Auditorium.
Missouri	University City	October 27–28	Spoke at City Hall.
Minnesota	Minneapolis	October 28	Spoke at Target Center.
Illinois	Chicago	October 28	Spoke at Daley Plaza.
Ohio	Columbus	October 29	Spoke at Ohio State University's St. John Arena.
Pennsylvania	Philadelphia	October 29	Spoke at the University of Pennsylvania's Hill Field.
Michigan	Ypsilanti	October 30	Spoke at Eastern Michigan University's Bowen Field House.
Colorado	Denver	October 30	Addressed a Colorado Democratic Coordinated Campaign and African-American Initiative of Colorado Democrats event at the Red Lion Inn. Spoke at the National Western Events Center.
Arizona	Tempe	October 31	Spoke at Arizona State University's Grady Gammage Memorial Auditorium.
Nevada	Las Vegas	October 31	Spoke at the Clark County Government Center.
California	Oakland, Santa Barbara	October 31–November 1	Spoke at Jack London Square and at Santa Barbara City College.

== November ==
State or country	Areas visited	Dates	Details
Texas	El Paso	November 1	Spoke at El Paso International Airport.
New Mexico	Las Cruces	November 1	Spoke at New Mexico State University.
Texas	San Antonio	November 1–2	Spoke at The Alamo.
Arkansas	Little Rock	November 2	Spoke at Adams Field.
Louisiana	New Orleans	November 2	Spoke at Woldenberg Park.
Florida	Tampa, West Palm Beach	November 3	Spoke at St. Paul African Methodist Episcopal Church in Tampa and Palm Beach International Airport.
New Jersey	Union Township	November 3	Spoke at the municipal building.
Massachusetts	Springfield	November 3	Spoke at Court Square.
Maine	Bangor	November 4	Spoke at Bangor International Airport.
New Hampshire	Bedford, Manchester	November 4	Spoke at the Merrimack Restaurant in Manchester.
Ohio	Cleveland	November 4	Spoke at Cleveland State University's Convocation Center.
Kentucky	Lexington	November 4	Spoke at the University of Kentucky.
Iowa	Cedar Rapids	November 4	Spoke at the Five Seasons Center.
South Dakota	Sioux Falls	November 4	Spoke at the Sioux Falls Arena.
Arkansas	Little Rock	November 5–6	Voted in the presidential election at Little Rock Union Station. Celebrated his re-election victory at the Old State House.
Hawaii	Honolulu	November 15–18	Vacation and extended stopover on the way to Australia.
Australia	Sydney, Canberra, Port Douglas	November 19–23	State visit. Addressed joint meeting of Parliament. Visited the Great Barrier Reef.
Philippines	Manila, Subic	November 24–25	Attended the APEC Summit Meeting. The President stayed in the MacArthur Suite at the Manila Hotel during his visit.
Thailand	Bangkok	November 25–26	State visit.
Alaska	Anchorage	November 26	Stopover at Elmendorf Air Force Base on the way back from Thailand.

== December ==
State or country	Areas visited	Dates	Details
Pennsylvania	Philadelphia	December 7	Attended the Army–Navy Game at Veterans Stadium.
North Carolina	Jacksonville	December 23	Visited servicemembers at Marine Corps Base Camp Lejeune.
South Carolina	Hilton Head	December 30–January 1	Holiday vacation.
