= Amanda Hopkins =

Amanda Hopkins is an American professional baseball scout who worked for the Seattle Mariners. She was the second woman to be a full-time baseball scout after Edith Houghton.

== Career ==
Hopkins is the daughter of Ron Hopkins, who served as a baseball scout for the Pittsburgh Pirates, Texas Rangers, and Oakland Athletics during her childhood. Hopkins attended games with her father while growing up, which led her to want to be a scout. She started reading radar gun numbers off to her father when she was 8 years old.

Hopkins attended Central Washington University, where she majored in psychology and played softball. In the offseason, she worked out with the men's baseball team to build her knowledge about baseball.

Hopkins interned at the Seattle Mariners's baseball operations department, focusing on amateur scouting, when she was in college. After performing well during a two-week Major League Baseball scouting development program in 2015, Hopkins was hired by Mariners Scouting Director Tom McNamera to be an area scout of high school and college players for the Four Corners region of the United States.

As the first female scout in more than 50 years, she says she occasionally faces surprise from players she is scouting when they discover she's female. Women traditionally have a harder time breaking into roles like baseball scouting because they play softball, not baseball, in school; almost all scouts are former players. Hopkins' work with her father and her lifelong drive to know about the game of baseball gave her the skills necessary to do her job.

Hopkins was listed as a Mariners scout in 2020 but not in 2022.

== Personal ==
She graduated from Mount Rainier High School in Seattle in 2011. Her brother, Ross Hopkins, was selected by the Cincinnati Reds in the 2007 MLB draft.
