= List of USL Youth League clubs =

- Sport: Youth Football
- Founded: 1988
- No. of teams: ~700
- Country: United States and Canada

Below is a list to links to the list of USL Youth League clubs. The USL Youth League (previously known as Super Y League) is one of the most competitive youth soccer leagues in American soccer along with the Development Academy and MLS Next. Many of the past and current clubs are affiliated USL professional teams or used to be affiliated with MLS clubs. Back in 2007, when it was still branded as Super Y, it had been hit hard by the creation of the Development Academy program. Many of the older clubs have migrated their teams to the Development Academy.

== Mid-South Division ==
=== Current clubs ===
| Club | City | State |
|---|---|---|
| West Side Alliance SC | Tulsa, OK | Oklahoma |
| Texoma FC | Melissa, TX | Texas |
| Denton Diablos FC | Denton, TX | Texas |
| Kernow Storm City FC | Dallas-Fort Worth, TX | Texas |
| Steel United Texas | McKinney, TX | Texas |
| North Texas United FC | Denton, TX | Texas |

== Mid-Atlantic Division ==
=== Current clubs ===
| Club | City | State |
|---|---|---|
| Alexandria Soccer Association | Alexandria, VA | Virginia |
| Annapolis Select FC | Annapolis, MD | Maryland |
| Arlington Soccer Association | Arlington, VA | Virginia |
| Bethesda SC | Bethesda, MD | Maryland |
| Christos FC | Gambrills, MD | Maryland |
| DC Eleven Football Club | Washington, DC | District of Columbia |
| Fairfax Virginia Union | Fairfax, VA | Virginia |
| Future Soccer Club | Lanham, MD | Maryland |
| Great Falls Reston | Great Falls, VA | Virginia |
| Loudoun Soccer | Leesburg, VA | Virginia |
| Luciano Emilio Soccer Club | Kensington, MD | Maryland |
| Maryland Rush | Gaithersburg, MD | Maryland |
| Maryland United FC | Bowie, MD | Maryland |
| Northern Virginia SC | Manassas, VA | Virginia |
| Northern Virginia United FC | Northern Virginia | Virginia |
| NOVA Majestics McLean | McLean, VA | Virginia |
| NOVA Majestics Springfield | Springfield, VA | Virginia |
| Real Elite FC | Montgomery County, MD | Maryland |
| The St. James FC | Springfield, VA | Virginia |
| VA Marauders | Winchester, VA | Virginia |
| Virginia Development Academy | Woodbridge, VA | Virginia |
| Virginia Valor FC | Chantilly, VA | Virginia |
| Villarreal VA | Springfield, VA | Virginia |

=== Former clubs ===
| Club | City | State |
|---|---|---|
| Baltimore Bays | Baltimore | Maryland |
| Crystal Palace FC USA | Baltimore | Maryland |
| Damascus SC | Damascus | Maryland |
| D.C. United Academy | Washington, D.C. | Washington, D.C. |
| FC Delco | West Chester | Pennsylvania |
| FC Frederick | Frederick | Maryland |
| FC New York | Locust Valley | New York |
| FC Westchester | Purchase | New York |
| Harrisburg City Islanders | Harrisburg | Pennsylvania |
| Hockessin SC | Hockessin | Delaware |
| Intense Soccer Academy | Mineola | New York |
| Mid Atlantic Soccer Academy | Robbinsville | New Jersey |
| New Jersey Rangers | Denville | New Jersey |
| New York Freedom | New York City | New York |
| New York Red Bulls Academy | Newark | New Jersey |
| New York Rough Riders | Plainview | New York |
| Philadelphia Soccer Club | Philadelphia | Pennsylvania |
| Players Development Academy | Franklin | New Jersey |
| Ocean City FC | Ocean City | New Jersey |
| Quickstrike FC | Newburgh | New York |
| Reading Rage | Reading | Pennsylvania |
| Reston FC | Reston | Virginia |
| South Jersey Barons | Mantua Township | New Jersey |
| Storm Academy | Queens | New York |
| Washington Freedom | Washington, D.C. | Washington, D.C. |
| Northern Virginia FC/Northern Virginia Royals/Majestics | Manassas | Virginia |
| Real Maryland F.C. | Rockville | Maryland |
| Thunder Soccer Club | Ellicott City | Maryland |
| Triangle FC | Cary | North Carolina |
| Virginia Alliance | Nokesville | Virginia |
| Washington FC | Washington, D.C. | Washington, D.C. |
| Washington Spirit | Washington, D.C. | Washington, D.C. |
| Calvert Soccer Association | Huntingtown | Maryland |
| FASA | Fredericksburg | Virginia |

== Midwest Division ==
=== Midwest ===
| Bloomingdale Lightning FC | Bloomingdale, IL | Illinois |
| Chicago City Soccer Club | Chicago, IL | Illinois |
| Chicago Inferno | Chicago, IL | Illinois |
| Chicago Rush SC | Chicago, IL | Illinois |
| Chicago Soccer Academy | Chicago, IL | Illinois |
| Chicagoland United SC | Chicago, IL | Illinois |
| Cleveland Force SC | Cleveland, OH | Ohio |
| Columbus Force | Columbus, OH | Ohio |
| DBBS | Portage, MI | Michigan |
| Evolution SC | Chicago, IL | Illinois |
| FC Milwaukee Torrent | Milwaukee, WI | Wisconsin |
| FORCE FCLC | Crystal Lake, IL | Illinois |
| Galaxy SC | Naperville, IL | Illinois |
| Indy Eleven North | Middlebury, IN | Indiana |
| Kingdom Soccer Club | Portage, MI | Michigan |
| Liverpool FC Michigan Central | Pontiac, MI | Michigan |
| Liverpool FC Michigan West | Ann Arbor, MI | Michigan |
| Michigan Rangers FC | Hudsonville, MI | Michigan |
| Midland SC | Midland, MI | Michigan |
| Midwest United FC | Kentwood, MI | Michigan |
| Midwest United FC SCOR | Rockford, MI | Michigan |
| Nationals | Detroit, MI | Michigan |
| Oak Brook SC | Oak Brook, IL | Illinois |
| Portage Soccer Club | Portage, MI | Michigan |
| Rush Union Wisconsin | Kenosha, WI | Wisconsin |
| Team Chicago SC | Chicago, IL | Illinois |
| TBAYS North Storm | Traverse City, MI | Michigan |
| Toledo Villa FC | Toledo, OH | Ohio |
| Upper 90 FC | Seville, OH | Ohio |
| VARDAR Soccer Club | Detroit, MI | Michigan |

=== Former clubs ===
| Club | City | State |
|---|---|---|
| Bangu Tsunami Soccer Club/Minnesota Thunder Academy | Minneapolis | Minnesota |
| Blast F.C. | Columbus | Ohio |
| Carmel United | Carmel | Indiana |
| Chicago Magic | Frankfort | Illinois |
| Chicago Sockers | Palatine | Illinois |
| Cleveland Force | Cleveland | Ohio |
| Des Moines Menace | Des Moines | Iowa |
| FC Indiana | Indianapolis | Indiana |
| Fort Wayne Fever | Fort Wayne | Indiana |
| Grand Valley Soccer Club | Portage | Michigan |
| Kings Soccer Academy | Wilder | Kentucky |
| Madison Capital Elite | Madison | Wisconsin |
| Metro FC | Shawnee | Kansas |
| Michigan Fire Juniors | Hudsonville | Michigan |
| Michigan Wolves | Livonia | Michigan |
| Ohio Elite Soccer Academy | West Chester | Ohio |
| Penns Forest FC | North Huntingdon | Pennsylvania |
| St. Louis Lions Academy | St. Louis | Missouri |
| TKO Premier SC | Kalamazoo | Michigan |
| Toledo Slayers | Toledo | Ohio |
| United FC | Louisville | Kentucky |
| Alliance Academy | Grand Rapids | Michigan |
| Chicago Fire Juniors | Bridgeview | Illinois |
| Cleveland Soccer Academy | Cleveland | Ohio |
| Dayton Dutch Lions | Dayton | Ohio |
| Force Football Club Academy | West Bloomfield | Michigan |
| Indiana Invaders | South Bend | Indiana |
| Internationals Soccer Club | Cleveland | Ohio |
| Kalamazoo Kingdom | Kalamazoo | Michigan |
| London Gryphons | London | Ontario |
| Mequon United | Mequon | Wisconsin |
| OBSC | Oak Brook | Illinois |
| St. Louis Lions | St. Louis | Missouri |
| TNT Dynamite Soccer Club | Lansing | Michigan |
| Toronto Lynx | Toronto | Ontario |
| Waza FC | Rochester Hills | Michigan |

== Eliminated Division - New England Division ==
=== Former clubs ===
| Club | City | State |
| Club | City | State |
|---|---|---|
| Black Watch SC | Binghamton | New York |
| Lightning Soccer Club | Hanover | New Hampshire |
| Mass Premier Soccer Bulldogs/Renegades | Waltham | Massachusetts |
| Mass Premier Soccer Crusaders | Braintree | Massachusetts |
| Mass Premier Knights | Lexington | Massachusetts |
| NHPSA | Bedford | New Hampshire |
| Nordic Soccer Club | Essex | Vermont |
| Seacoast United Mariners | Scarborough | Maine |
| Black Watch SC Rhode Island | Providence | Rhode Island |
| JBS FC | Lewisboro | New York |
| Maine Premier Soccer Phoenix | Portland | Maine |
| Odyssey Sport | Oneida | New York |
| Ottawa Fury | Ottawa | Ontario |
| Rhode Island Stingrays | Providence | Rhode Island |
| Seacoast United Phantoms\Wanderers | Portsmouth | New Hampshire |
| Western Mass Pioneers | Ludlow | Massachusetts |

== North Atlantic Division ==
=== Current clubs ===
| AC Connecticut | Danbury, CT | Connecticut |
| Barcelona SC | New York, NY | New York |
| Brooklyn Italians Youth SC | Brooklyn, NY | New York |
| Cedar Stars Academy HV | Ridgefield Park | New Jersey |
| Commack Soccer | Commack, NY | New York |
| Dix Hills SC | Dix Hills, NY | New York |
| East Meadow SC | East Meadow, NY | New York |
| FC Motown STA | Morristown, NJ | New Jersey |
| Hudson Valley Hammers | Hudson Valley, NY | New York |
| Inter Connecticut FC | Norwalk, CT | Connecticut |
| Ironbound SC | Newark, NJ | New Jersey |
| Istria SC | New York, NY | New York |
| Kearny Thistle United | Kearny, NJ | New Jersey |
| LIJSL Academy | Islip, NY | New York |
| Long Island Rough Riders | Massapequa, NY | New York |
| Massapequa SC | Massapequa, NY | New York |
| Morris Elite SC | Morris County, NJ | New Jersey |
| New York Braveheart SC | New York, NY | New York |
| New York Titans F.C | New York, NY | New York |
| NY Surf | New York, NY | New York |
| Oceanside United SC | Oceanside, NY | New York |
| Paisley Athletic FC | Kearny, NJ | New Jersey |
| PASCO Soccer Club | Wayne, NY | New York |
| Union County FC | Westfield, NJ | New Jersey |
| Union SC | Union, NJ | New Jersey |
| Westchester Flames | Westchester, NY | New York |

=== Former clubs ===
| Club | City | State |
|---|---|---|
| Brooklyn Knights | Maspeth | New York |
| BW Gottschee | Queens | New York |
| Central Jersey Spartans | Lawrenceville | New Jersey |
| Ironbound SC | Newark | New Jersey |
| Keystone Athletic SC | Stroudsburg | Pennsylvania |
| Match Fit Academy | Princeton | New Jersey |
| National Soccer Academy | Newark | New Jersey |
| New Jersey Soccer Academy | Aberdeen | New Jersey |
| New Jersey Stallions | Clifton | New Jersey |
| New York Magic | New York City | New York |
| Parsippany SC | Parsippany | New Jersey |
| Patriot FC | New Hope | Pennsylvania |
| Princeton Soccer Association | Princeton | New Jersey |
| Rage SC | Leesport | Pennsylvania |
| Soccer Plus Academy | Newburgh | New York |
| Super Nova FC | Hershey | Pennsylvania |
| TSF Academy | Montclair | New Jersey |
| Westchester Flames | New Rochelle | New York |

=== Former clubs ===
None

== Eliminated - South Atlantic Division ==
=== Former clubs ===
| Club | City | State |
|---|---|---|
| Alpharetta Ambush | Alpharetta | Georgia |
| Atlanta Fire United | Duluth | Georgia |
| FC Nashville | Nashville | Tennessee |
| Knoxville Soccer Academy | Knoxville | Tennessee |
| Norcross Soccer Academy | Norcross | Georgia |
| Southern Soccer Academy | Marietta | Georgia |
| Southern Soccer Academy of Coastal Georgia | Savannah | Georgia |
| Wake FC | Cary | North Carolina |

=== Former clubs ===
| Club | City | State |
|---|---|---|
| Atlanta Silverbacks | Atlanta | Georgia |
| Augusta FireBall | Augusta | Georgia |
| Beach FC | Virginia Beach | Virginia |
| CASL Academy | Raleigh | North Carolina |
| Charlotte Soccer Club | Charlotte | North Carolina |
| Diadora United | Aiken | South Carolina |
| Greensboro Dynamo | Greensboro | North Carolina |
| Hampton Roads Piranhas | Virginia Beach | Virginia |
| Richmond Kickers | Richmond | Virginia |
| Richmond Strikers | Glen Allen | Virginia |
| Williamsburg Legacy | Williamsburg | Virginia |
| Wilmington Hammerheads | Wilmington | North Carolina |

== Eliminated - South East Division ==
=== Former clubs ===
| Club | City | State |
|---|---|---|
| Chivas Florida Soccer | Palmetto | Florida |
| Clay County SC | Lakeside | Florida |
| FC America | Orlando | Florida |
| FC United of Florida | Palm Coast | Florida |
| Florida Fire Juniors | Naples | Florida |
| Kendall SC | Miami | Florida |
| Orlando City SC | Orlando | Florida |
| Space Coast United SC | Melbourne | Florida |
| VSI Pinellas | St. Petersburg | Florida |
| VSI Tampa Flames | Tampa | Florida |
| West Pines United | Pembroke Pines | Florida |

=== Former clubs ===
| Club | City | State |
|---|---|---|
| Ajax Orlando FC | Orlando | Florida |
| Central Florida Kraze | Sanford | Florida |
| Clearwater International FC | Clearwater | Florida |
| Cocoa Expos | Cocoa | Florida |
| Countryside Lightning | Clearwater | Florida |
| FC Sarasota | Sarasota | Florida |
| Florida Rush | Apopka | Florida |
| FUTSOC | Weston | Florida |
| Miami Strike Force | Miami | Florida |
| Ocala Stampede | Ocala | Florida |
| Plantation FC | Plantation | Florida |
| Schulz Academy | Boca Raton | Florida |
| Sunrise SC | Fort Lauderdale | Florida |
| Tampa Bay Fusion | Tampa | Florida |
| VSI West Florida Flames | Brandon | Florida |
| Wellington Wave | Wellington | Florida |
| Weston FC | Weston | Florida |

== Canada West Division ==
=== Current clubs ===
None

=== Former clubs ===
| Club | City | State |
|---|---|---|
| Calgary Wildfire | Calgary | Alberta |
| Edmonton Clippers SC | Edmonton | Alberta |
| Edmonton Force | Edmonton | Alberta |
| FC Calgary | Calgary | Alberta |
| Lethbridge United | Lethbridge | Alberta |

== Pacific North California Division ==
=== Current clubs ===
None

=== Former clubs ===
| Club | City | State |
|---|---|---|
| Ballistic United | Pleasanton | California |
| Bayside Soccer Academy | Burlingame | California |
| Cal Cougars | Stockton | California |
| Cal Odyssey | Clovis | California |
| Capital Athletic Soccer Academy | Sacramento | California |
| De Anza Premier | Saratoga | California |
| Diablo FC | Concord | California |
| Fremont SC | Fremont | California |
| Juventus Sport Club | Redwood City | California |
| Marin FC | Greenbrae | California |
| Mustang SC | Danville | California |
| North Cal Lamorinda United | Orinda | California |
| San Francisco Seals Academy | San Francisco | California |
| San Francisco United | Richmond | California |
| San Juan Soccer Academy | Sacramento | California |
| San Ramon Soccer Club | Danville | California |
| Santa Cruz County Breakers Academy | Santa Cruz | California |
| Santa Rosa United | Santa Rosa | California |
| USA 17 Ruckus SC | Saratoga | California |

== Pacific Northwest Division ==
=== Current clubs ===
None

=== Former clubs ===
| Club | City | State |
|---|---|---|
| Abbotsford Mariners | Abbotsford | British Columbia |
| Cascade Surge | Salem | Oregon |
| Coastal FC | Surrey | British Columbia |
| Coquitlam Metro-Ford SC | Coquitlam | British Columbia |
| Crossfire Premier | Redmond | Washington |
| Evergreen Soccer Club | Everett | Washington |
| FC Portland | Portland | Oregon |
| Mountain FC | Burnaby | British Columbia |
| Northwest Nationals | Mountlake Terrace | Washington |
| Revolution Football Club | Surrey | British Columbia |
| Snohomish County Selects | Everett | Washington |
| Spokane Soccer Club | Spokane | Washington |
| Thompson-Okanagan FC | Vernon | British Columbia |
| Vancouver Whitecaps FC | Vancouver | British Columbia |
| West Coast Capitals | Victoria | British Columbia |
| Yakima Reds | Yakima | Washington |

== Pacific South California Division ==
=== Current clubs ===
None

=== Former clubs ===
| Club | City | State |
|---|---|---|
| Arsenal F.C. | Temecula | California |
| Blast SC | San Bernardino | California |
| Camarillo Eagles SC | Camarillo | California |
| Canyon Panthers Soccer Academy | Anaheim | California |
| Celtic Harps | Ontario | California |
| Cerritos Regional SC | Cerritos | California |
| Chelsea SC | Yorba Linda | California |
| Claremont Stars | Claremont | California |
| Cypress FC | Cypress | California |
| DBWV United | Diamond Bar | California |
| Del Mar Sharks | San Diego | California |
| FC Barcelona USA | Fullerton | California |
| Force SC | Torrance | California |
| Fullerton Rangers | Fullerton | California |
| Galaxy Elite | Los Angeles | California |
| Glendora FC | Glendora | California |
| LA Premier FC | Pasadena | California |
| Los Alamitos Vikings | Garden Grove | California |
| Los Angeles Rampage | Los Angeles | California |
| Monarcas USA | Norwalk | California |
| Nevada Cruz Azul | Las Vegas | Nevada |
| Nomads SC | San Diego | California |
| North Huntington Beach FC | Huntington Beach | California |
| Orange Junior Soccer Club | Orange | California |
| Orange Soccer Club | Orange | California |
| Oxnard FC | Oxnard | California |
| Palmdale Thunder | Palmdale | California |
| Pateadores Academy | Rancho Santa Margarita | California |
| Palos Verdes Soccer Club | Palos Verdes | California |
| Real So Cal | Woodland Hills | California |
| RSF Attack | Solana Beach | California |
| San Diego Surf (soccer) | San Diego | California |
| Santa Barbara SC | Santa Barbara | California |
| Santa Clarita United | Santa Clarita | California |
| Santa Monica United | Santa Monica | California |
| Simi Valley Eclipse | Simi Valley | California |
| Slammers FC | Newport Beach | California |
| So Cal Blues | San Juan Capistrano | California |
| South Bay SC | Oceanside | California |
| Southwest SC | Temecula | California |
| Strikers FC | Irvine | California |
| Tustin Soccer Club | Tustin | California |
| Valley United SC | Los Angeles | California |
| West Coast FC | Mission Viejo | California |
| Wolfpack SC | Huntington Beach | California |

== Rocky Mountain Division ==
=== Current clubs ===
None

=== Former clubs ===
| Club | City | State |
|---|---|---|
| Boulder County Force | Boulder | Colorado |
| Colorado Rapids Academy | Commerce City | Colorado |
| Colorado Rush | Littleton | Colorado |
| Real Salt Lake Academy | Sandy | Utah |
| Real Salt Lake Arizona Academy | Casa Grande | Arizona |

== See also ==
- USL Youth League
- United Soccer Leagues
- U.S. Soccer Development Academy
