= Scout (sport) =

Professional employed by a sports team

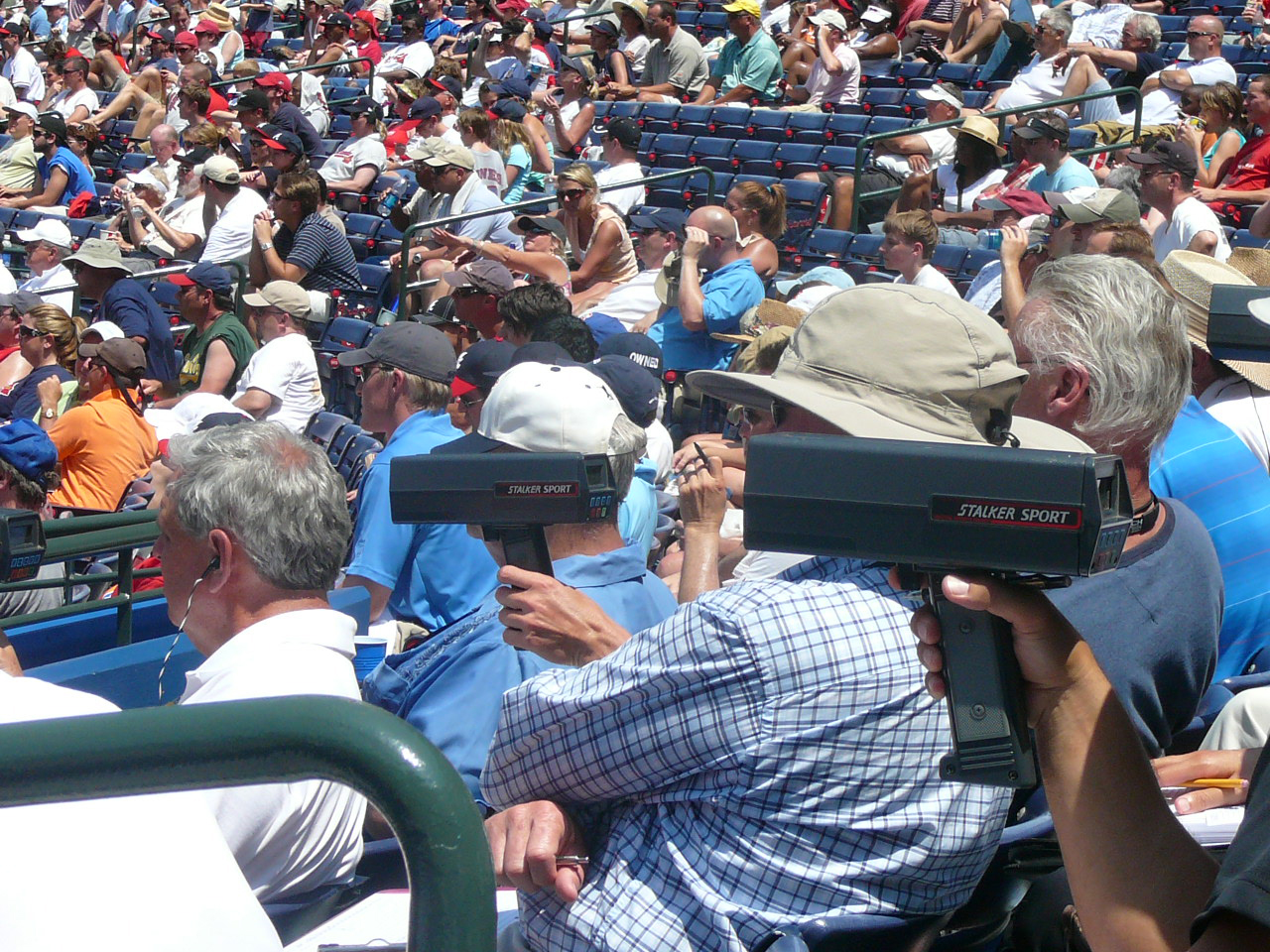
Baseball scouts using radar guns at a game to track pitch speed at Turner Field in 2008

In professional sports, scouts are experienced talent evaluators who travel extensively for the purposes of watching athletes play their chosen sports, and they determine whether their set of skills and talents represent what is needed by the scout's organization. Some scouts are interested primarily in the selection of prospects; younger players who may require further development by the acquiring team, but who are judged to be worthy of that effort and expense for the potential future payoff that it could bring, while others concentrate on players who are already polished professionals, whose rights may be available soon, either through free agency or trading, and who are seen as filling a team's specific need at a certain position. Advance scouts watch the teams that their teams are going to play in order to help determine strategy.

Many scouts are former coaches or retired players, while others have made a career just of being scouts. Skilled scouts who help to determine which players will fit in well with an organization can be the major difference between success and failure for the team with regard to wins and losses, which often relates directly to the organization's financial success or lack thereof as well.

== Kinds of scouts ==
Scouts tend to have to perform one of two tasks, either scouting opposition teams to research the opposition's players and tactics, or scouting individual players to identify their level of skill and to keep track of potential new signings.

Contemporary Major League Baseball teams usually classify scouts and their differing responsibilities as follows:

- Advance scouts follow MLB clubs that their team is scheduled to play and file reports on trends and tendencies that influence pitching, defensive, offensive and game strategy.
- Major League scouts and professional scouts (the most senior of whom are sometimes called "special assignment scouts" or "special assistants to the general manager") typically track active players under contract to other teams for potential acquisition. They also may support advance scouts or evaluate competing minor league organizations. Per their designation, the former follow players in MLB, while "pro scouts" work minor league and independent league baseball.
- Amateur scouts evaluate high school and college baseball players and prepare their MLB teams for the July amateur draft. To ensure that players are seen by multiple evaluators, amateur scouts are usually divided into area scouts, regional cross-checkers and national cross-checkers.
- International scouts cover players not from the United States, Puerto Rico and other U.S. territories, or Canada. These players are signed as international free agents and are not subject to the summer draft, although bonus amounts and signing regulations are governed by the collective bargaining agreement between MLB and its players' union. In addition to the Dominican Republic, Venezuela, Mexico, and other Latin American and Caribbean countries, where MLB teams have had a scouting presence since the mid-20th century, the growth in international baseball has compelled most teams to station scouts in East Asia, Oceania, Africa, and Europe. International scouting also involves cross-checking to enable multiple evaluators to validate the reports of local scouts.

According to Tony Lucadello, considered by some to be the greatest scout ever, the four kinds of scouts start with the letter 'P':

- Poor – wastes time looking for games rather than having a planned itinerary
- Picker – emphasizes a player's one weakness to the neglect of all strengths and ignores the potential within
- Performance – bases his evaluation on what a player does in his presence
- Projector – envisions what a player will be able to do in two or three years

Lucadello estimated that five percent of scouts were poor, five percent pickers, 85 percent performance scouts and five percent projectors.

== Computer-aided scouting ==
Modern day scouts are becoming more and more reliant on computer programs to aid and assist in the evaluation of talent being scouted. Many professional sport clubs now use computers to organize their collected information and data. Most sports still depend on human management to decide which players their organization will draft or sign.

== Notable scouts ==
=== Baseball ===
- Hugh Alexander
- Joe Devine
- Amanda Hopkins
- Edith Houghton
- Paul Krichell
- David Lander
- Tony Lucadello
- Bobby Mattick
- Ray Shore
- Joe Sugden

=== American football ===
- Steve Belichick — late assistant coach and scout for the United States Naval Academy, author of Football Scouting Methods (1962), and father of former NFL head coach Bill Belichick.
- Gil Brandt – former San Francisco 49ers scout who joined the expansion Dallas Cowboys in 1960 and, as director of player personnel, revolutionized the process of talent identification and evaluation and, with Tom Landry and Tex Schramm, was a pillar of Dallas' 1960s and 1970s dynasty; member of Pro Football Hall of Fame.
- Dick Haley — architect of 1970s Pittsburgh Steelers dynasty.
- Bill Nunn — legendary scout for Pittsburgh Steelers.

=== Basketball ===
- Will Robinson- also scouted for the NFL's Detroit Lions.
- Kevin Mackey, Indiana Pacers

=== Association football (soccer) ===
- Piet de Visser
- Geoff Twentyman
- Les Kershaw
- Jack Hixon
- Liam Brady
- Pierluigi Casiraghi
- Jorge Alvial

=== Ice hockey ===
- Håkan Andersson
- Garnet Bailey
- Mike Liut
- Bobby Orr

=== Professional wrestling ===
- Jim Ross
- Matt Bloom
- Jim Smallman
- Jim Cornette
- Paul Heyman
- AJ Styles
