= Pueblo County Courthouse =

- U.S. National Register of Historic Places
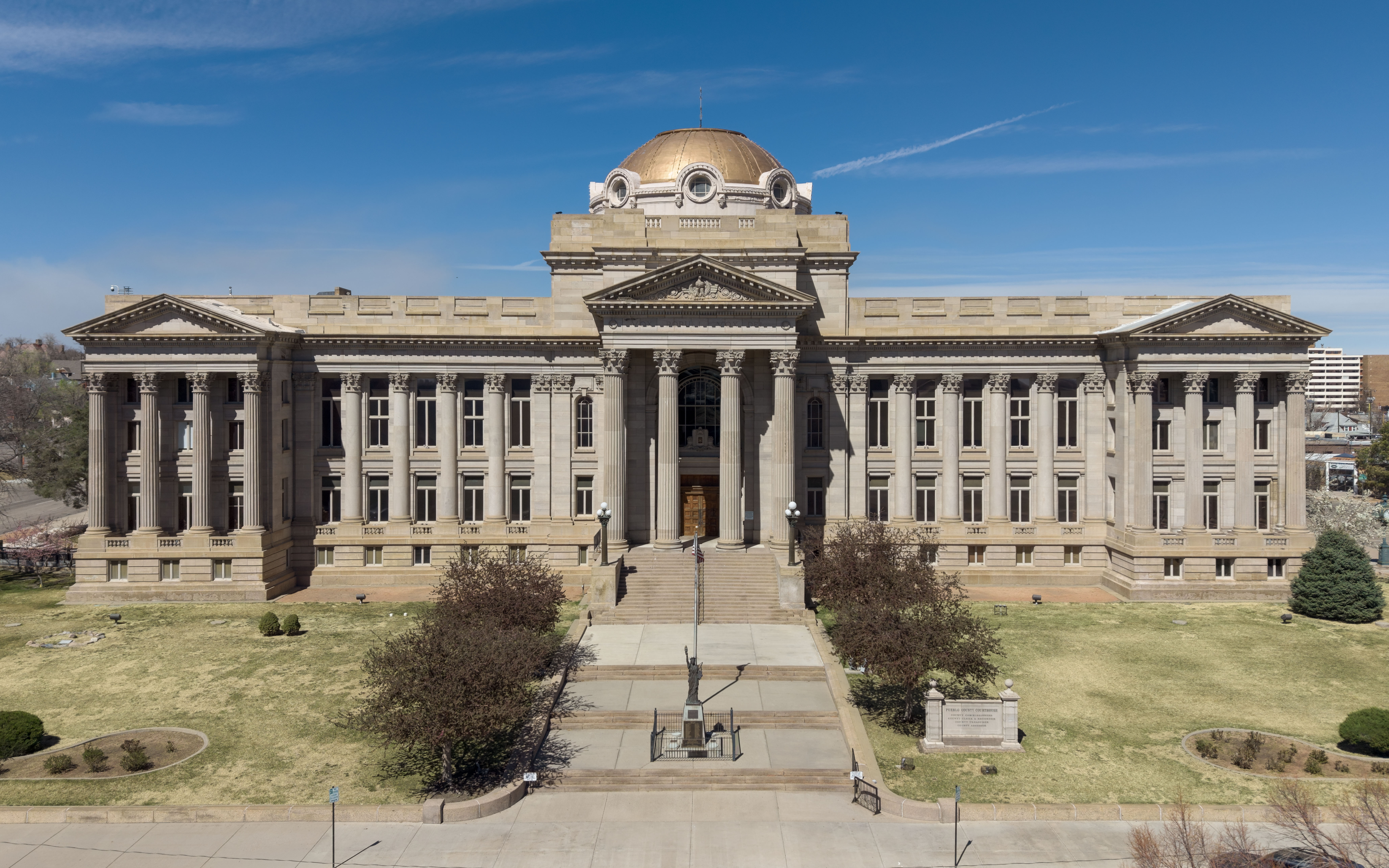
- Location: 10th St. and Main St., Pueblo, Colorado
- Coordinates: 38°16′36″N 104°36′33″W
- Built: 1908-1912
- Architect: Albert Ross
- Architectural style: Beaux Arts
- NRHP reference No.: 75000534
- Added to NRHP: 1975-06-27

The Pueblo County Courthouse is a historic courthouse in Pueblo, Colorado.

The building, designed by New Yorker Albert Ross, and executed in 1908–12 in brick and white sandstone, was the third building to serve as the county courthouse.

It has a very unusual double dome, i.e. there is an area between interior and exterior domes.

The stones are set in stretcher bond.

Portions of its interior are decorated by stencil wall painting and murals by J. Charles Schnorr, some with gold leaf work. These decorate the rotunda walls, the County Commissions' Chambers and the building's three courtrooms, including their canvas ceilings of the courtrooms. Schnorr was a regionally known painter who lived in Pueblo. He studied in New York, Vienna, and Paris.

Detail of tympanum over main entry

The pediment over the main entry has an elaborate tympanum.
