= Jorge Alvial =

Chilean football manager

Personal information
- Date of birth: 1959 (age 66–67)
- Place of birth: Iquique, Chile
- Position: Goalkeeper

Senior career*
Years	Team	Apps	(Gls)
- Deportes Iquique
1988–1990	Washington Stars	4	(0)

Managerial career
- 2006: Puerto Rico Islanders
- * Club domestic league appearances and goals

Jorge Alvial is a Chilean football coach/sports manager and current head of scouting for FC Cincinnati. Previously, he had been an international scout for Manchester United, and for Chelsea for over nine years.

== Career ==
He had a career as a football player with Deportes Iquique in his country of birth and with American clubs such as Washington Stars, where he coincided with Mark Pulisic, the father of Christian.

In 2006, Alvial was the manager of the USL Puerto Rico Islanders, recruiting players such as three-time Argentine national title winner Gustavo Barros Schelotto and Chilean international Arturo Norambuena to join his team. However, during his 2006 undefeated season, however, he left the team to be chief scout of the Americas for Chelsea alongside Hans Gillhaus and world-known scout Piet de Visser.

From when he joined Chelsea in 2006, Alvial has worked with Chelsea managers José Mourinho, Carlo Ancelotti, André Villas-Boas, Guus Hiddink, Luiz Felipe Scolari and Avram Grant.

On 11 January 2008, though still hired at Chelsea, Alvial joined the FC Dallas coaching staff for a short period of time to evaluate players at the Major League Soccer (MLS) level. Alvial, however, returned to Chelsea to continue his position as chief scout for the Americas the same year.

Alvial did not work in the MLS very long. He was linked to convincing the Argentine Legend of Boca Juniors, Guillermo Barros Schelotto to the Columbus Crew for only a salary cap of only $150,000 the first year. With Schelotto, Columbus won their first ever MLS Cup Playoffs. Alvial was also linked to getting Marcos González and three-time Chilean national title champion Milovan Mirošević to sign for the Crew.

During his short spell at FC Dallas, Alvial discovered Brek Shea at the MLS Combine and twins Rogelio and Ramiro Funes Mori at the Sueño MLS. FC Dallas first round pick was Shea at the MLS SuperDraft; Shea later went to play for the United States national team and signed for a fee of $3.8 million in Stoke City.

Before Alvial went back to scout for Chelsea, he discovered the Funes Mori twins at MLS Sueño. The twins did not end up signing in FC Dallas and instead signed for a bigger and more world-known club River Plate – Ramiro, the defender, won the national title and Copa Sudamericana with River Plate while Rogelio, the forward, soon signed at Benfica for €2 million.

In 2024, Alvial became the owner of Panamanian club Herrera FC.

In February 2026, Alvial acquired the 58% of the shares of Chilean club Deportes Linares.

== Personal life ==
Alvial has one daughter, Isabel Alvial, and three sons named Jorge, Greyson, and professional footballer Javier Alvial.
