= Raphel Ortiz =

Puerto Rican footballer (born 1975)

Personal information
- Full name: Raphel Ortiz Huertas
- Date of birth: November 30, 1975 (age 50)
- Place of birth: San Juan, Puerto Rico
- Position: Midfielder

Team information
- Current team: Bayamon FC

Senior career*
Years	Team	Apps	(Gls)
2004–2008	Puerto Rico Islanders	?	(?)
2008	Sevilla FC Bayamon	14	(?)
2009	Academia Quintana	16	(?)
2010-current	Bayamon FC	2	(0)

International career
2006-current	Puerto Rico	9	(4)
- * Club domestic league appearances and goals as of 9 July 2008

Raphel "Mime" Ortiz (30 November 1975 in San Juan, Puerto Rico) is a Puerto Rican professional football player. He is currently playing with Bayamon FC of the Puerto Rico Soccer League. He also plays for the Puerto Rico national team.
