= Alexis Curet =

Puerto Rican association football player

Alexis Rivera
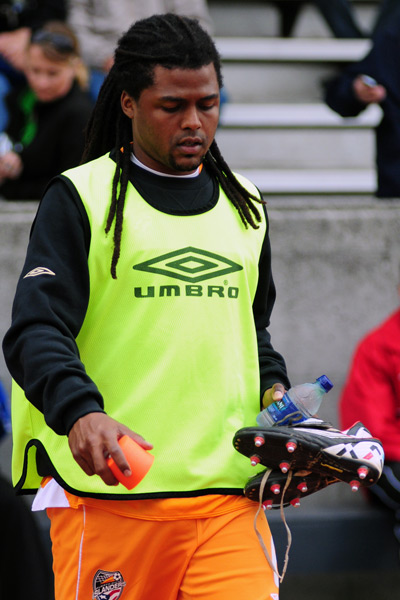
- Rivera with the Islanders

Personal information
- Full name: Alexis Rivera Curet
- Date of birth: October 29, 1982 (age 44)
- Place of birth: San Juan, Puerto Rico
- Height: 5 ft 9 in (1.75 m)
- Positions: Defender; midfielder

Team information
- Current team: Bayamón FC
- Number: 6

Youth career
- Atléticos de San Juan

Senior career*
Years	Team	Apps	(Gls)
2001–2003	Atléticos de San Juan		
2004–2012	Puerto Rico Islanders	145	(1)
2014–	Bayamón FC		

International career^{‡}
2004–2016	Puerto Rico	30	(0)
- * Club domestic league appearances and goals as of August 24, 2016 ‡ National team caps and goals as of August 24, 2016

Alexis "Pasa" Rivera Curet (born October 29, 1982) is a Puerto Rican footballer who currently plays for the Puerto Rico Soccer League club Bayamón FC and current community relations director for Puerto Rico FC.

== Career ==
=== Club ===
Rivera began his career with Atléticos de San Juan in his native Puerto Rico. He participated in tournaments through England, South America, Spain with San Juan, and also represented Puerto Rico in the Caribbean and Central American Games.

Rivera signed with the Puerto Rico Islanders prior to their first season in the A-League in 2004, and has been a part of the team ever since. He won the 2004 Athlete of the Year award from the Puerto Rico Soccer Federation, and was part of the Islanders team which won the 2008 USL First Division regular season title and progressed to the semi-finals of the CONCACAF Champions League 2008–09. He was the player with most league appearances for the Islanders.

After the dissolution of the Islanders in 2012, Rivera continued play with local Puerto Rico teams as well as the national team, most recently earning the spot of Captain for the newly re-formed Puerto Rico Bayamon F.C., a team scheduled to commence play within the NPSL in its 2014 season and the CFU.

==== International ====
Rivera is also a full international for the Puerto Rico national football team, and played in two of Puerto Rico's qualifying games for the 2010 FIFA World Cup. He also played against Canada, Saint Kitts and Nevis and Saint Lucia in the 2014 World Cup qualifier.

== Honors ==
=== Puerto Rico Islanders ===
- USSF Division 2 Pro League Champions (1): 2010
- Commissioner's Cup Winners (1): 2008
- CFU Club Championship Winner (1): 2010
