= Toribio Rojas =

Costa Rican football manager (born 1945)

Personal information
- Full name: Toribio Rojas Gamboa
- Date of birth: 14 February 1945 (age 81)

Senior career*
Years	Team	Apps	(Gls)
	Alajuelense	345	(109)
1967	Ramonense		

International career
- Costa Rica

Managerial career
- Ramonense
- Puntarenas
- San Carlos
- 1993–1995: Costa Rica
- 1996: Guanacasteca
- 1997: Carmelita
- 1997: Pérez Zeledón
- 1998–1999: Fraigcomar
- 2003: Bayamón-Lincoln
- 2002–2003: Puerto Rico
- 2006–2007: Puerto Rico Islanders
- * Club domestic league appearances and goals

Toribio Rojas Gamboa (born 14 February 1945) is a Costa Rican retired football player who worked for ten years as a manager in Puerto Rico.

== Playing career ==
Rojas earned his place in the history of Ramonense, when he scored the goal that lifted the team to Costa Rica's top tier in 1968.

== Managerial career ==
Rojas managed the Costa Rica National team from 1993 to 1995, but was dismissed in January 1996 after failing at the 1995 UNCAF Nations Cup. In January 1997 he was named manager of Carmelita after resigning from his post at second division Guanacasteca.

In 2006, he announced he would retire in 2009 when his contract with Puerto Rico Islanders would run out.
