= Hugo Maradona =

Argentine footballer and manager (1969–2021)

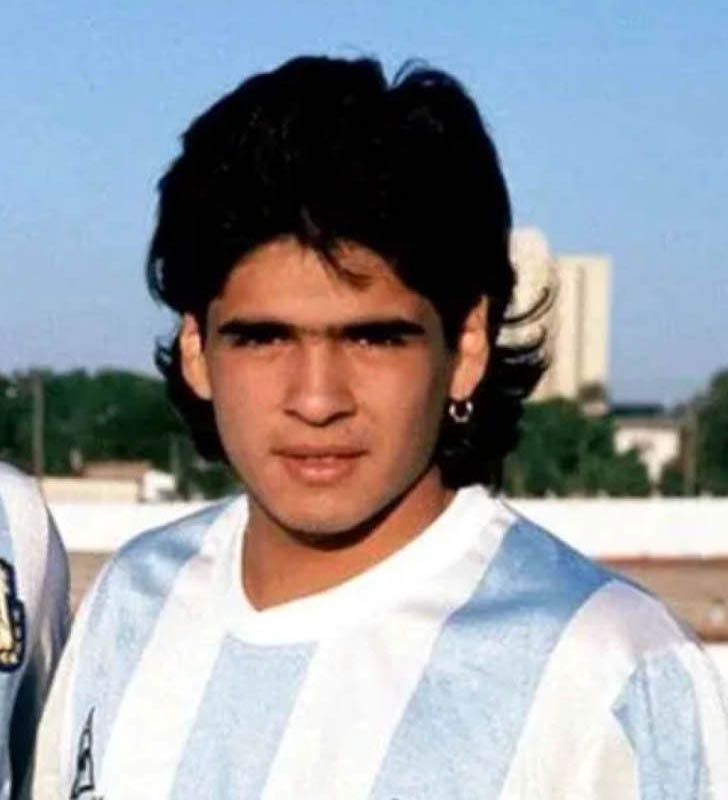
- Hugo Maradona in 1987

Personal information
- Full name: Hugo Hernán Maradona
- Date of birth: 9 May 1969
- Place of birth: Lanús, Argentina
- Date of death: 28 December 2021 (aged 52)
- Place of death: Monte di Procida, Italy
- Height: 1.65 m (5 ft 5 in)
- Position: Midfielder

Senior career*
Years	Team	Apps	(Gls)
1985–1987	Argentinos Juniors	19	(1)
1987–1988	Ascoli	13	(0)
1988–1990	Rayo Vallecano	64	(9)
1990	Rapid Wien	3	(0)
1990	Deportivo Italia	33	(5)
1991	Progreso	0	(0)
1992–1994	PJM Futures	49	(31)
1995–1996	Avispa Fukuoka	48	(33)
1997–1998	Consadole Sapporo	56	(15)
1999	Toronto Italia	0	(0)

International career
1985	Argentina U16	11	(4)

Managerial career
- 2004–2005: Puerto Rico Islanders
- * Club domestic league appearances and goals

Hugo Hernán Maradona (9 May 1969 – 28 December 2021), also known as El Turco, was an Argentine football player and manager. He was the younger brother of Diego Maradona. He played as a midfielder for clubs in South America, Europe, Japan, and Canada, and was a member of the Argentina U-16 national team.

== Career ==
In 1985, Maradona was a part of the Argentina U-16 national team's squad that competed at the U16 South American and World Championships in China. In Argentina's first round match against Congo, he scored two goals to help the team to a 4–2 win, which however was one goal short of what Argentina needed to advance past the group stage.

During 1987, Hugo Maradona was bought by Ascoli to play in the Italian Serie A championship. He played just 13 matches without scoring a goal and was sold at the end of the season to Rayo Vallecano in Spain. During 1989 he moved again, that time to Rapid Wien, and after that experience he went back to Argentina.

In 1992, he moved to Japan to play for the PJM Futures (renamed as Tosu Futures after changing their hometown in 1994), which was aiming to promote to the newly inaugurated J.League. After playing for Futures for three seasons, he played for Fukuoka Blux (known as Avispa Fukuoka since 1996) in the 1995 and 1996 seasons and Hokkaido Consadole Sapporo in the 1997 and 1998 seasons.

After retiring from association football as a player, Maradona lived a relatively quiet life in Argentina.

In 2004, Hugo Maradona moved part-time to Puerto Rico, where he became part of that country's association football federation's attempt to invigorate the sport among Puerto Ricans by becoming the head coach of the Puerto Rico Islanders, a team in the American USL First Division. He then moved back to Italy, working for a number of youth and amateur teams in the Naples region.

== Personal life and death ==
Maradona was born in Lanús on 9 May 1969, as the youngest sibling of brothers Diego Maradona and Raúl Maradona, both noted footballers in their own right. His father Diego Maradona "Chitoro" (1927–2015), who worked at a chemicals factory, was of Guaraní (Indigenous) and Galician (Spanish) descent, and his mother Dalma Salvadora Franco, "Doña Tota" (1929–2011), was of Italian descent.

He died from a heart attack at his home in Monte di Procida, near Naples, on 28 December 2021, at the age of 52, a year after his brother Diego. He had 3 children with his ex-wife, Delia Occhionero: fraternal twins, Nicole and Thiago, and daughter Melina.

== Honour ==
Argentinos Juniors

- Copa Interamericana: 1985

Argentina Youth

- South American U-17 Championship:1985
- South American Games: 1986
