= Union Township, New Jersey =

Union Township, New Jersey is the name of:

== Existing townships ==
- Union Township, Hunterdon County, New Jersey
- Union Township, Union County, New Jersey
  - Union (CDP), New Jersey, the township's downtown area

== Defunct municipalities ==
- Union Township, Bergen County, New Jersey, now Lyndhurst, New Jersey as of 1917
- Union Township, Camden County, New Jersey, dissolved in 1868
- Union Township, Hudson County, New Jersey, dissolved in 1898
- Union Township, Ocean County, New Jersey, now Barnegat Township, New Jersey

== See also ==
- Union Township (disambiguation)
- Union Beach, New Jersey
- Union City, New Jersey
- Union County, New Jersey
