= Arturo Norambuena =

Chilean footballer (born 1971)

Personal information
- Full name: Arturo Andrés Norambuena Ardiles
- Date of birth: 24 November 1971 (age 54)
- Place of birth: Valdivia, Chile
- Height: 1.80 m (5 ft 11 in)
- Position: Forward

Youth career
- Universidad Austral

Senior career*
Years	Team	Apps	(Gls)
1996	Iberia		
1997	Santiago Morning	20	(4)
1998	Universidad de Concepción		
1999	Audax Italiano	31	(12)
2000–2003	Universidad Católica	110	(49)
2004	Quilmes	3	(0)
2004–2005	Cobreloa	41	(10)
2006	Puerto Rico Islanders	21	(5)

International career
2001–2003	Chile	5	(1)

Managerial career
- 2015: Cobresal
- 2017–2018: Barnechea
- 2019: Deportes Valdivia
- * Club domestic league appearances and goals

Arturo Andrés Norambuena Ardiles (born 24 November 1971) is a Chilean football manager and former player who played as forward.

== Playing career ==
Norambuena represented the team of Universidad Austral before playing professional football, being well-known by his stint with Universidad Católica.

Norambuena also was involved with Chile's national set-up.

== Coaching career ==
=== Deportes Valdivia ===
On 27 August 2019, Norambuena was appointed manager of Deportes Valdivia. However, after a period with bad results, he was fired on 2 October 2019.

== Personal life ==
Norambuena graduated in forestry in Universidad Austral de Chile. Because of this, he was nicknamed El Ingeniero del Gol (The Goal Engineer) while he was a footballer.

Norambuena is the cousin of the brothers Iván and Mauricio Hernández Norambuena, former guerrilla fighters of the political-military organization FPMR (Frente Patriótico Manuel Rodríguez), who played football for club Orompello from Valparaíso as defenders, winning the regional championship, and after took part in the 1977 Amateur Youth National Championship in Pedro de Valdivia nitrate works representing the Valparaíso city team alongside fellows such as Juan Carlos Letelier, later a Chile international, and Jaime Zapata, later a professional goalkeeper. Later, Iván played for Quintero Unido and Mauricio for Iván Mayo.

== Honours ==
Universidad Católica

- Primera División de Chile: 2002 Apertura

Cobreloa

- Primera División de Chile: 2004 Clausura
