= Puerto Rico Islanders =

Defunct Puerto Rican association football club

- Full name: Puerto Rico Islanders Football Club
- Nicknames: Tropa Naranja (Orange Troop); Los Isleños (The Islanders)
- Founded: 1 January 2003
- Dissolved: 27 October 2012
- Stadium: Juan Ramón Loubriel Stadium; Bayamón, Puerto Rico
- Capacity: 22,000
- Owner: Andy Guillemard
- League: North American Soccer League
- 2012: Regular season: 3rd, Playoffs: quarterfinals
Home colors	Away colors	Third colors

The Puerto Rico Islanders were a Puerto Rican professional association football team based in Bayamón, Puerto Rico. The team was founded in 2003, and played in several different leagues from 2004 to 2012, when the team suspended operations. In the last two seasons of existence, the team played in the North American Soccer League (NASL), the second tier of the American soccer pyramid. They played their home games at Juan Ramón Loubriel Stadium. The team's colors were orange and white. The team was dissolved after the 2012 season, and the team was succeeded by Puerto Rico FC.

== History ==
=== USISL franchise ===
The Puerto Rico Islanders were first founded in 1995, and made their first appearance in the USISL, now the United Soccer Leagues (USL) that same year. The team played in San Juan. The team was founded by Joe Serralta and other Puerto Rican businessmen and played only seven games on the island.

However, the first iteration lasted only seven games. Various differences with the local league led Serralta and the other businessmen to move the franchise to Houston, Texas, and change the team's name to the Houston Force. The move was also prompted by problems with the Puerto Rican Football Federation and low attendances. The Force folded after one game in Houston.

Added to this, FIFA withdrew its financial support from the Puerto Rico Football Federation, which amounted to $250,000 annually. Things got tough for this group of entrepreneurs.

=== Early years (2003–2005) ===
It wasn't until 2003 that the franchise was restarted, the FIFA subsidy was recovered, and an agreement was reached with the city of Bayamón, with Mayor Ramón Luis Rivera Jr., who supported the idea of incorporating soccer as a sport in that municipality. This support was not only logistical but also financial, as the renovation and adaptation of the then Lubriel stadium to the requirements of the Federation began at an approximate cost of $3,000,000.

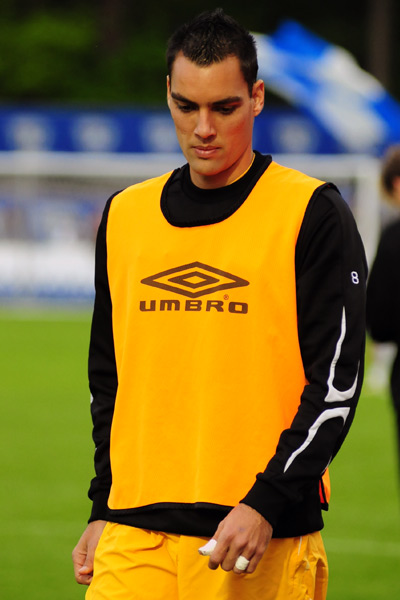
Mauricio Salles scored 25 goals for the Islanders in their first two competitive seasons

Hence, eight years after Serralta's first attempt at professional football, he gave it another go and together with a new group of Puerto Rican businessmen officially created another incarnation of the Puerto Rico Islanders. The team played their first season in the A-League in 2004. The original squad included a large number of local Puerto Rican players as well as a contingent of mainland Americans, Brazilians, Salvadorans and Argentines. The team was coached by Brazilian Vitor Hugo Barros who was replaced several games into the season by Argentine Hugo Hernán Maradona, brother of the legendary Diego Armando Maradona. The team played its first league game on April 17, 2004, against the Toronto Lynx at the Juan Ramon Loubriel Stadium, the Islanders lost 1–0 in front of a reported 6,000 fans. The Islanders had their first victory on January 15, 2004, against the Charleston Battery with a score of 1–0 at the Juan Ramon Loubriel Stadium. Led by players like Mauricio Salles, Raúl Díaz Arce and Luis Fernando Zuleta Mechura the Islanders finished the 2004 season in 14th place, with a record of 5 wins, 17 losses and 6 ties.

In 2005, the Islanders still under Hugo Hernán Maradona brought in a new group of players that would become staples in the club for the next couple of seasons (Petter Villegas, Marco Vélez, Dan Kennedy, Caleb Norkus, Alejandro González Pareja and Noah Delgado), and retained several key players like Mauricio Salles. At the end of the season, the Islanders had an improved season record with 10 wins, 10 losses and 8 ties, this time barely missing the playoff.

=== Jorge Alvial Era (2006–2007) ===
The Islanders opened their 2006 season with a mix of new players like Argentine Gustavo Barros-Schelotto, Chilean Arturo Norambuena, Canadian Alen Marcina, and homegrown talent Marco Vélez, Alexis Rivera Curet, Rafael Ortiz Huertas, and American Dan Kennedy to create one of the strongest lineups in the club's short history, in a serious attempt to take the USL Div. 1 title for the first time.

Formed under the management of then head coach Jorge Alvial, the 2006 Islanders had a record of 3–2–1 up to early June, when Alvial put in his resignation to become a scout for the English club Chelsea. The club lumbered across the last half of the season barely making the playoffs, under the new head coach Toribio Rojas, Jorge Alvial's assistant coach, finishing the season in 6th place and with a record of 10–8–10.

In the weekend before the 2006 playoffs, the Islanders hosted Miami FC twice, who had Brazilians Romário and Zinho in their line up. The Islanders needed four points to qualify for the Playoffs. After going down 0–2 in the first half the Islanders managed to come back and win 4–2 in front of 8,600.

In the final game of the season against Miami on September 10, 2006, they attracted a record crowd of nearly 11,000 fans. Early in the second half Miami took the lead. It wasn't until the 43rd minute of the second half that the Islanders equalized with an Arturo Norambuena penalty. A draw was sufficient for the Islanders to qualify in front of Seattle and Atlanta.

In the first round of the playoffs, the team played a home-away series against the Charleston Battery. Unfortunately for the Islanders, Charleston won the series 3–2, ending the 2006 season for the Puerto Ricans.

The team came into the 2007 season on a high, they had just played a preseason tournament against MLS teams and achieved very successful results. They also had signed several dangerous players like Panamanian trio Victor Herrera, a Panamanian international, Gustavo Avila, and Alberto Zapata, a new goalkeeper Josh Saunders, rookie Jay Needham, plus a return of players like Marco Vélez, Petter Villegas and Noah Delgado. The squad was considered serious contenders for the title.

After one early success, the team took a turn for the worse. It was evident that Toribio Rojas had lost his edge and after an embarrassing 2–1 loss against bottom table Minnesota Thunder was let go from his coaching position and given the post of Youth System Director, when he left the team with a record of 1–3–3. Also, attendance declined.

=== Clarke Era (2007–2011) ===
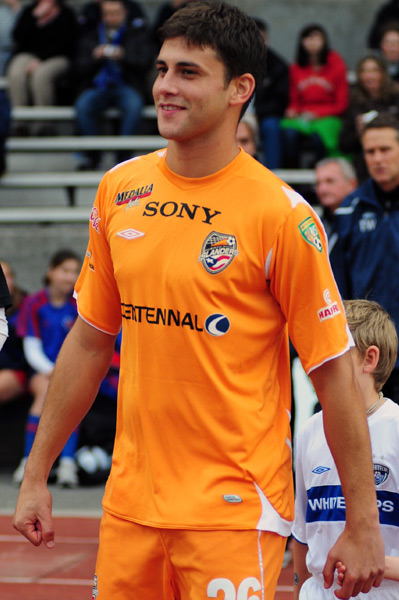
Cristian Arrieta was a two-time USL Defender of the Year, and the 2009 USL-1 MVP

Acting quickly, the club replaced Rojas with former FC Dallas manager Colin Clarke, who had found himself without a job after the Virginia Beach Mariners went out of business. He immediately established himself as a hard and hotheaded coach demanding discipline from his players. Shortly after he was nicknamed "El General" by the media and fans because of the way he led the squad during practice. This change also translated in a change of fortunes for the club, in the first match under Clarke the club beat the Minnesota Thunder 2–1, just a week after, under Toribio, they had lost against them. Clarke also brought in players who would become key figures in the future like Haitian International Fabrice Noel, then Englishman, now Kenyan International, Taiwo Atieno Willie Simms on loan from New England Revolution, and John Krause, who played briefly for Clarke on the Mariners. The club would finish comfortably in 6th place, two spots on top of the last playoff spot.

The Islanders managed to edge out Montreal during its Quarterfinals series with an aggregate score of 5–3, but fell 4–2 in penalties against regular-season champions Seattle Sounders after losing the home leg and tying the series in Seattle.

The 2008 season would be Clarke's first full season as the club's manager and he worked quickly to revamp the club's line-up, bringing back just a few players from the 2007 squad. He would bring in players like Sandi Gbandi, Jonny Steele, Bill Gaudette, Kendall Jagdeosingh, Osei Telesford among other who would prove key in the race for the regular season title. After a brief preseason in Florida playing against weaker college sides, the Islanders started the 2008 season with a 1–0 defeat against Portland, the club had a slow start with a record of 1 victory, 2 ties and 3 losses in its first 6 games, but by the end of July the Islanders were on a 5-game victory streak that would lay the foundation for their first Commissioner's Cup run. On August 8 the club would beat Rochester 4–0 putting them for the first time at the top of the table, a position they would compete for against Vancouver for the rest of the season.

The Islanders would finish the season with a 15–9–6 record clinching the first position and the Commissioner's Cup. On top of that they achieved this even with a crowded schedule that had them playing 4 games a week between the CCL and the USL-1 Regular season and the Playoffs.

The Islanders would be seeded in the semifinals of the league's Playoffs where they would beat Rochester on an aggregate of 3–2 winning them a spot in the finals against Vancouver. In a controversial decision, the league awarded Vancouver the right to host the finals. After a 3–0 defeat against Santos Laguna in the CCL the club headed to Vancouver where after a hard-fought game, the Islanders lost 2–1. The club would also sweep the USL-1 individual awards starting with Coach of the Year Colin Clarke, Defender of the Year (Cristian Arrieta), Goalkeeper of the Year (Bill Gaudette), and USL-1 MVP (Jonny Steele).

The Islanders just coming off a successful 2008 season started preparations for 2009 early in February where they traveled to Florida for a group of friendlies against teams like New York Red Bulls, Chicago Fire and the 2008 MLS Champions Columbus Crew. The club in an attempt to repeat what was achieved the previous year brought back the bulk of the roster with the notable exception of Kenyan International Taiwo Atieno and Salvadorian Edwin Miranda. Also they signed manager Colin Clarke to a three-year contract as a way to bring continuity to the squad.

Before the CCL's Quarterfinals Clarke, as a way to strengthen the squad brought in midfielder Martin Nuñez from the Carolina Railhawks, defender Kevon Villaroel from San Juan Jabloteh, and striker Sean Fraser from Miami FC. But most notably Jamaican striker Nicholas Addlery who had an immediate impact on the club scoring 5 goals in his first five games with the Islanders. The club would make it all the way to the semi-finals, where they lost to Cruz Azul of Mexico in penalty shots after the series was tied 3–3 in Estadio Azul, Mexico City on April 7. During this time they also acquired former Los Angeles Galaxy defender Kyle Veris, midfielder Domenic Mediate, who had just been released from D.C. United, and goalkeeper Chris McClellan formally with the Carolina Railhawks.

Almost two weeks after their defeat in the CCL the club entered the USL 1 season as heavy favorites opening their season against defending Champions Vancouver Whitecaps on April 18 with a 2–1 victory at Juan Ramon Loubriel Stadium, Bayamón. In September 2010 the Islanders announced they were leaving the USL to join the North American Soccer League for the 2011 season.

Clarke left the Islanders at the end of the 2011 season after accepting the job as Carolina RailHawks head coach, replacing Martin Rennie at that club, who had recently been promoted to head coach of Major League Soccer's Vancouver Whitecaps FC. On December 8, 2011, Islanders assistant coach Adrian Whitbread was named Clarke's successor. The Islanders finished 3rd in the regular season but were upset by the Minnesota Stars in the playoffs.

=== Suspension of play and Puerto Rico FC (2012–2015) ===
The Islanders announced in late 2012 that they would sit out the spring half of the 2013 North American Soccer League season; later, they announced that they would sit out the entire 2013 season with the aim of restructuring and returning for 2014. This came on the heels of a season where the Islanders were forced to play home games at Bayamon Soccer Complex while Juan Ramón Loubriel Stadium was being renovated and subsequently averaged just 1,864 fans. In August 2013, club management informed the league that the Islanders would not resume league activities in 2014 due to an inability to secure adequate funding. In 2015, Puerto Rico FC was founded and the Islanders' supporter groups were revived. The new club began play during 2016 North American Soccer League season.

== International performance ==
In 2006 the Islanders venture into the international stage participating in the CFU Club Championship, in hope of qualifying for the CONCACAF Champions Cup. This is possible because Puerto Rican football is governed by the Federación Puertorriqueña de Fútbol instead of the United States Soccer Federation. This first attempt at international success was the first time a team from Puerto Rico ever participated in its confederation's club competitions. The CFU Club Championship 2006 played in November saw the Islanders host Group C which included Hoppers F.C. (Antigua and Barbuda), W Connection (Trinidad and Tobago) and Fruta Conquerors (Guyana), the latter dropped out of the tournament weeks before group play. The Islanders beat Hoppers FC 3–1 but lost to W-Connection 0–1 ending the squads first international appearance.

In October 2007, the Islanders came into the CFU Club Championship 2007 with a much stronger squad, which was relatively unchanged from the squad that made it to the semifinals of the USL First Division playoffs and it showed, making it all the way to the tournaments semifinals losing out to Joe Public F.C. 0–1 from a late goal. The entire tournament was played in Trinidad and Tobago, the Islanders headed their group with a 2–2 tied against Harbor View FC, which later became the tournament's champions, and two victories. In this tournament, the team also broke several of their on-field records, it achieved its highest score line, a 10–0 victory over Hitachi Centre SAP FC, in the same game Fabrice Noël scored the team's first ever hat trick with a tally of four goals. This would be the last time the Islanders would play to try to qualify to this incarnation of the confederations top club tournament, since this competition format was abandoned in 2008.

=== 2008–2009 CONCACAF Champions League ===
The team played in the new CONCACAF Champions League, which replaced CONCACAF Champions Cup in 2008–2009. The Islanders were given a chance to qualify as the 2008 CFU Club Championship would be played after the CCL starts, three Caribbean sides would be chosen from last years CFU CC; the Champions, runner-up and the third place team. Since the third place game wasn't played during the tournament the Islanders and San Juan Jabloteh (the 2007 local Trinidad & Tobago League Champions), the two teams that lost in the semifinals, played a Home-Away Series to determine who would take the last spot, which ended in a 1–0 aggregate in favor of the Islanders.

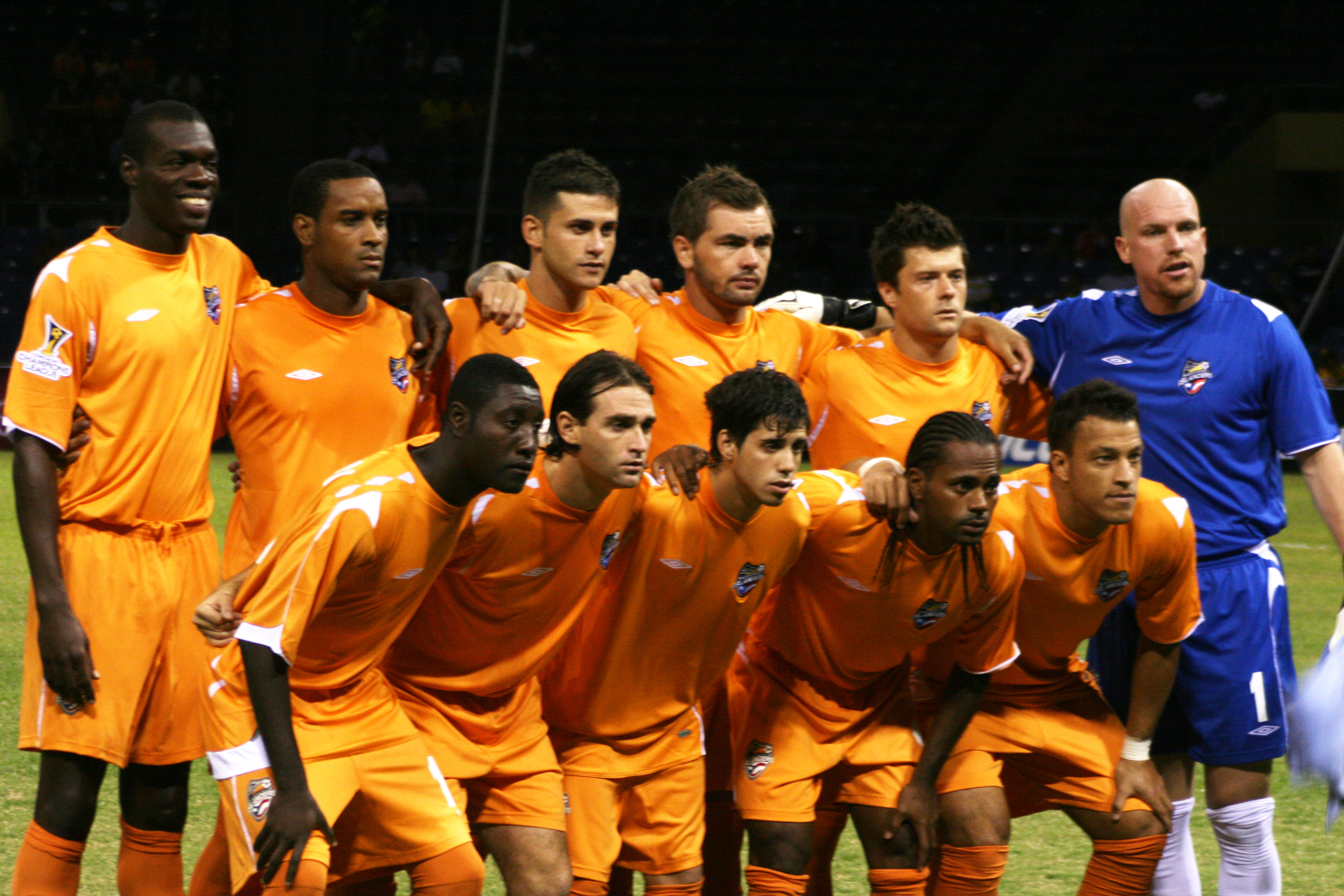
Islanders starting line-up vs Marathon at the Juan Ramon Loubriel during the 2008–2009 CCL.

The Islanders were later matched up against regional powerhouse L.D. Alajuelense of Costa Rica in the preliminary round of the CONCACAF Champions League. The first leg of the series was played on August 27, 2008, in the Alajuelense home ground, the Estadio Alejandro Morera Soto and in front of 900 spectators, the game ended with a hard-fought 1–1 draw. The second leg was played on September 3, and it took the Islanders two late goals to come from behind and win the game 2–1; with an aggregate of 3–2, the Islanders advanced to the group stage, being placed in Group D, which included Club Santos Laguna, Tauro F.C., and C.S.D. Municipal. In the first game of this round, the team defeated Tauro F.C. by one goal, with a final score of 2–1. On September 23, the Islanders defeated Santos Laguna, 3–1. In the third game, the team tied with Municipal with two goals each. On the return matches, the team lost to Santos FC 3–0 in Torreón, Mexico playing with their "bench" team preparing for their respective USL semi-finals matches. After in a close game back in Puerto Rico it was C.S.D. Municipal's turn in a 0–1 loss with a goal near the end of the match. These two losses had the team in a tight position as they were also going through their USL finals match. It was a must win situation for the last match against Tauro F.C. in Panama or at least a tie in order to qualify for the next stage in the tournament. On October 29, 2008, Islanders FC vs Tauro F.C. ended in a battled 2–2 match which resulted in favor of Islanders FC and qualified them for the final eight of the CONCACAF Champions League. On December 10, 2008, the Islanders were paired against C.D. Marathón in the final eight draft. On February 26, 2009, the team defeated C.D. Marathón 2–1, playing at Juan Ramón Loubriel Stadium. In the second date of this stage, they pulled off a last-minute victory, one goal to none, in a game that took place at San Pedro Sula. On March 17, 2009, The Islanders defeated Cruz Azul, two goals to none, in the first leg of the semifinals in Bayamón. On the second leg, played on April 7, 2009, Cruz Azul won 2–0 and drove the game into extra time, where it ended 3–1, the away goal not being a tie breaker because the away goals rule do not apply in extra time in CONCACAF. The game was decided on penalties and ended 4–2 in favor of Cruz Azul.

=== 2009–10 CONCACAF Champions League ===
The Puerto Rico Islanders started the CONCACAF Champions League 2009-10 on July 29, 2009, against Toronto FC in preliminary round action. The Islanders won the first match 1–0 with a goal from Kendall Jagdeosingh. The return match was played to a goalless draw, and so the Islanders advanced to the group round.

In the Group Phase, the Islanders lost away to the Crew 2–0, then lost away at Saprissa. They were able to draw at home against Cruz Azul in Matchday 3, albeit after giving up the lead late in the match. On matchday 4, they were again ahead at home, but allowed a goal at the buzzer to leave the game a 1–1 draw vs Saprissa. On match day 5, the Islanders lost to Cruz Azul in Mexico City, 2–0. This loss officially eliminated the Islanders from advancement in the tournament.

=== 2010–11 CONCACAF Champions League ===
The Islanders began the Champions League on July 27, 2010, with a 4–1 away win at Major League Soccer's Los Angeles Galaxy and advanced to the group stage after winning 5–3 on aggregate (despite losing 1–2 at home). In the group stage, the Islanders finished 3rd behind Club Toluca and Club Deportivo Olimpia, getting eliminated from the competition.

=== PRSL Supercopa 2010 ===
2010 was the first year that the Puerto Rico Islanders played in a tournament from the PRSL in the form of the Supercopa DirecTV 2010. They were placed in group B of the tournament. The Islanders made their debut vs Sevilla FC Puerto Rico with the game ending as a draw. Four days later, they played Puerto Rico United with a final score of 3 to 0 in favor of them. On November 12, 2010, the Islanders thrashed Caguas Huracán 11 to nothing. The Islanders finished in second place in the Supercopa.

== Colors and badge ==
During the club's first two years (2004–2005) they played in all white and all blue kits, with no clear distinction between which was considered its home kit. In 2006 the club adopted orange, dark blue and white as their primary colors. That year they wore dark blue with thick vertical orange stripes and dark blue shorts as their home kits and orange with white thick vertical stripes and orange shorts as their away kit. In 2007 the club switch to orange with white vertical pinstripes and orange shorts as their home kits and dark blue with orange vertical stripes that curve towards the sleeve and dark blue shorts as their away kit. The current home kits is an all orange one, while the away kit is white with gray horizontal pinstripes and white shorts.

In 2006 the club also added a third kit which was white until 2007. In 2008 the club used a neon green kit with two lighter neon green vertical stripes and black shorts. For the present year, 2009, the third kit is solid royal blue shirt and shorts.

=== History of the kit ===
2004–05	2006	2007	2008	2009	2011–12

==== Stars on kit ====
The club decided to add a gold star to their logo following the USSF Division 2 Professional League play-off title win in 2010. Also, an additional two stars are embroidered on the left shirt sleeve to signify the CFU Club Cup successes of 2010 and 2011.

=== Kit manufacturers ===
- 2004–05: Legea
- 2006–07: Calvo
- 2008: Torino
- 2009–2011: Umbro
- 2012: Admiral

=== Shirt sponsors ===
- 2004–09: Centennial de Puerto Rico
- 2010–11: AT&T Inc.
- 2011–2012: Toyota

== Stadium ==
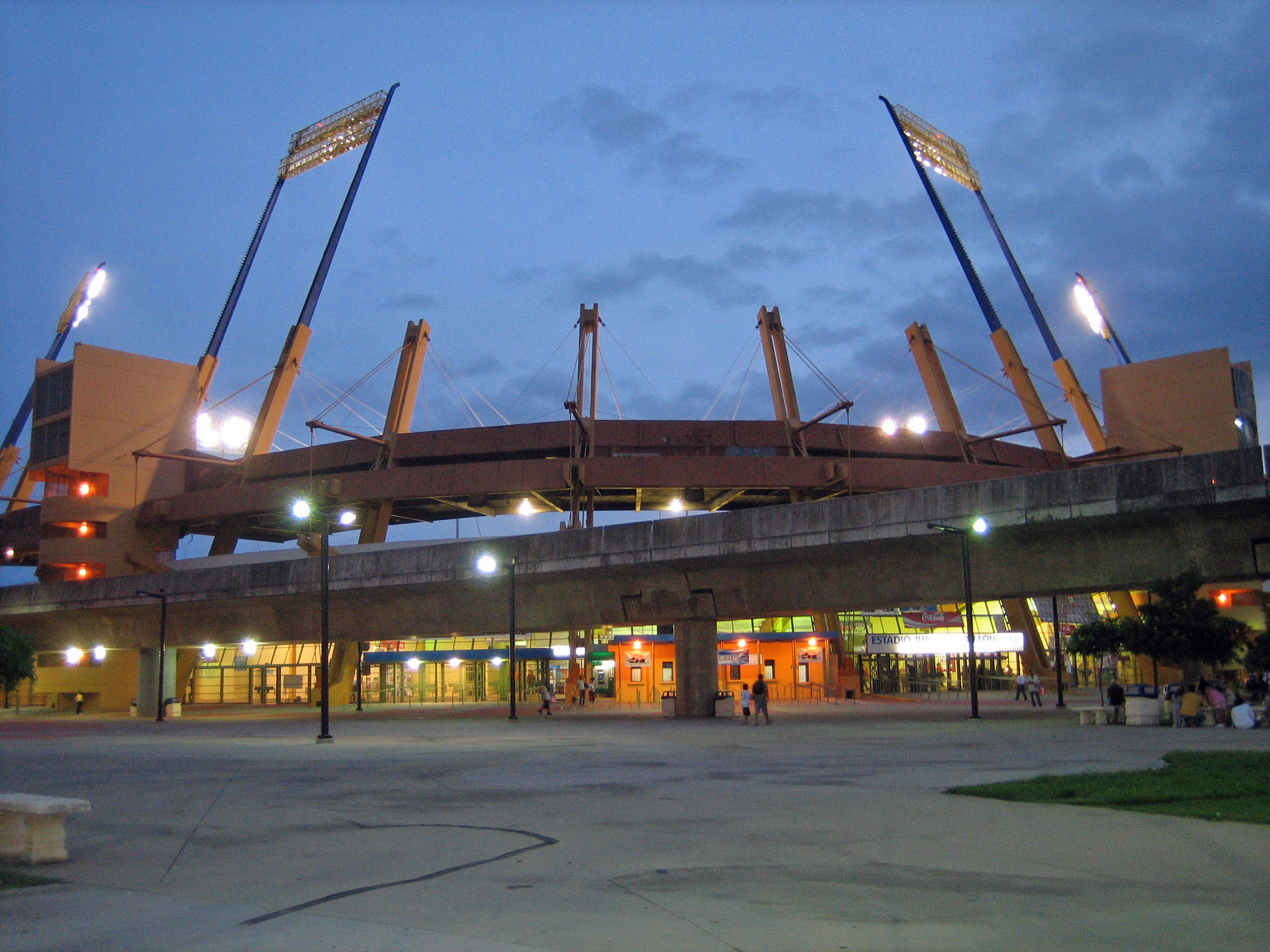
Juan Ramon Loubriel Stadium

The Puerto Rico Islanders played their home games at Juan Ramon Loubriel Stadium in the city of Bayamón, which is located about 10 minutes from the Capital San Juan. The "JRL", as it is now known, was originally a baseball stadium scheduled for demolition, and in 2003, it was converted into a soccer stadium for the Islanders. It is also home to all levels of the Puerto Rico national football team as well as also being the home of the Islanders' affiliate team in the local Puerto Rico Soccer League, Bayamón FC.

The stadium was originally built in 1973. Renovation works on the stadium began in November 2003 and were completed for the reopening game against the Toronto Lynx on April 17, 2004. The score was 1-0 in favor of the visitors, with an attendance of 5,000, a figure much higher than any winter league baseball game.

The stadium has a capacity of 12,500 spectators. In 2008, the USL did not allow the #1-seed Islanders to host the USL-1 Championship match, citing that the Stadium was unsuitable. The match was played in Vancouver, where Puerto Rico lost to the Whitecaps, 2–1. On December 8 of 2008, the Finance Vice-President of the club Jorge Pierluisi, established a preliminary meeting with the firm CMA Architects and Engineers along with Positive Impact-Sports and Entertainment Management Consultants to discuss and evaluate improvements to the stadium and the remodeling of such.

The stadium is served by the "Deportivo Melendez" station of the Puerto Rico Urban Train and is also known by its name as "La Islandera" and "El Cementerio de las Américas" (The Cemetery of the Americas) for the teams that have been knocked out of tournaments there.

== Club culture ==
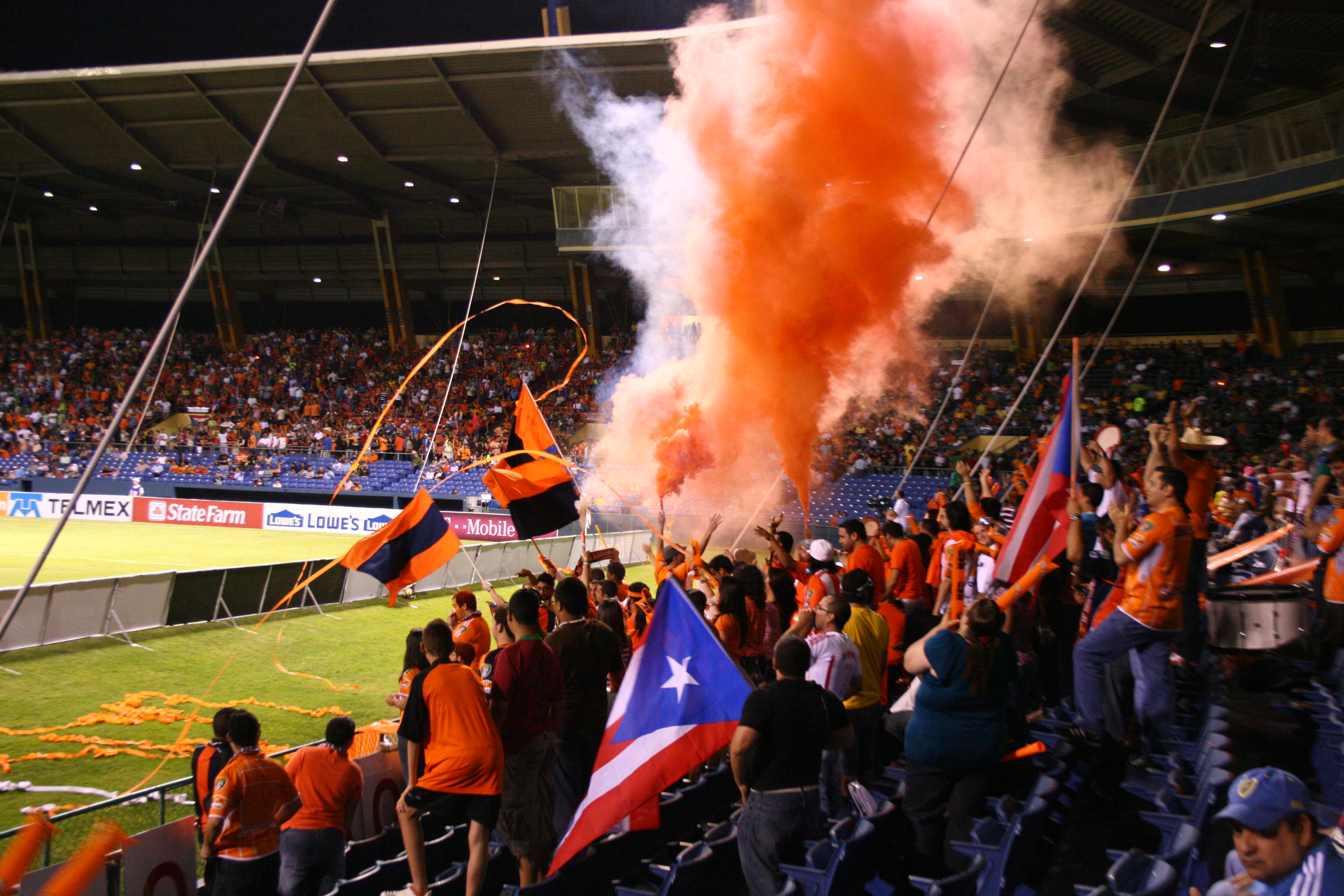
Orange Star Ultras

=== Supporters ===
The Islanders have a loyal fan base in Puerto Rico and a small but strong following in the States. Fans come from all over the Island to watch the club play in Bayamón, despite the regionalism of Puerto Rican culture when it comes to supporting professional sports. The team averages between 4,000 and 6,000 fans per game in its home stadium, Juan Ramon Loubriel. The club's supporter group is known as "La Barra Naranja" led by the O.S.U. or Orange Star Ultras. The Islanders also have an away game independent supporters group known as "La Legion Extranjera," or the Foreign Legion. This group is mostly composed of Islanders fans of Puerto Rican origin who live in the United States and travel to the cities in which the team plays.

=== Rivalries ===
The club's main rivalry was against the Charleston Battery, going back to the Islanders' first year in the A-League. Charleston was the first team the Islanders beat and since then the Islanders have routinely beaten or tied Charleston. In 2006, Charleston stopped the Islanders' playoff run, giving them their only victory in the series. In 2007, the Islanders beat the Battery in the last game of the season, stopping Charleston's hope for a playoff berth. The Islanders currently have a record of 10 wins, 1 loss and 7 ties against their South Carolina rivals. From 2008, the Islanders have met with the Rochester Rhinos in the USL-NASL playoffs with the Islanders eliminating the Rhinos from the series in both 2008 and 2009.

The Islanders' main rivals within Puerto Rico are Club Atlético River Plate Puerto Rico. Their rivalry dates back to around the year 2005 when River wanted to join the USL, but the Islanders had territorial rights in Puerto Rico and they didn't allow River to join. Ever since then River Plate's front office, fans, and some players have had a grudge against the Islanders. The rivalry is a very special one though because the teams had never faced in neither an official nor an unofficial match until 2010, even though the rivalry started way before then. With the Islanders joining the Puerto Rico Soccer League, their rivalry is expected to become into the first Puerto Rican Football Classic or "El Clásico Boricua". Their first two matches took place in the Supercopa DirecTV 2010 finals in 2010. River won both games and went on to win the championship.

=== Puerto Rico Islanders C ===
The Puerto Rico Islanders C is the club's U-20 team. It participates in the Puerto Rican 2nd Division, with the goal of developing players from PRISA with extraordinary potential so that they can eventually make the jump to either the Islanders or Bayamón FC.

=== Puerto Rico Islanders Academy ===
The Puerto Rico Islanders Soccer Academy or PRISA was founded in 2006 and it is made up of U6, U8, U12, U14, U15, U17 youth teams and the Islanders C squad (U20). In 2008 the Islanders opened another academy in the northern city of Arecibo under the PRISA umbrella called the Arecibo Islanders Soccer Academy, which is composed from U5 to U20 teams.

=== Mascot ===
The Puerto Rican Islanders' mascot was a large anthropomorphic bear named Populoso, who is also the corporate mascot of Banco Popular de Puerto Rico and wore the same color kit uniform as the Islanders. When the Islanders scored, Populoso was there to encourage the fans with the team's cheerleaders.

== Broadcasting ==
For the 2011 season, the company OneLink Communications broadcast all Puerto Rico Islanders home games in Spanish only for Puerto Rico. They broadcast in English via the official website of the Puerto Rico Islanders with live streaming for free.

== Notable personnel ==
=== Notable former players ===
For details of former players, see List of Puerto Rico Islanders players

=== Managers and head coaches ===
Information correct as of match played September 21, 2008. Only competitive matches are counted

Name	Nat	From	To	Record						
Name	Nat	From	To	P	W	D	L	F	A	%W
Vitor Hugo Barros	(Brazil)	April 2004	May 2004	8	0	2	6	—	—	0.00%
Hugo Hernán Maradona	(Argentina)	May 2004	January 2006	48	15	12	21	—	—	31.25%
Jorge Alvial	(Chile)	January 2006	May 2006	6	3	1	2	—	—	50.00%
Toribio Rojas	(Costa Rica)	May 2006	May 2007	33	9	11	13	—	—	27.27%
Colin Clarke	(Northern Ireland)	May 2007	December 2011	66	32	19	14	—	—	48.48%
Adrian Whitbread	(England)	December 2011	2012					—	—	

== Achievements ==
=== Domestic ===
- USSF D2 Pro League
  - Winner (1): 2010
- USL First Division
  - Runners-up (1): 2008
- Commissioner's Cup
  - Winner (1): 2008
- Supercopa DirecTV 2010
  - Runners-up (1): 2010
- Ponce De Leon Cup
  - Winner (4): 2006, 2007, 2009, 2011
- Bayamón Cup
  - Winner (1): 2012

=== CONCACAF ===
- CFU Club Championship
  - Winner (2): 2010, 2011
  - Runner-up (1): 2009

== Record ==
=== Year-by-year ===
Year	Division	League	Regular season	Playoffs	CFU Club Championship		CONCACAF				Avg. attendance
2004	2	USL A-League	9th, Eastern	did not qualify	CFUCC	did not participate	CCC	did not participate			3,889
2005	2	USL First Division	7th	did not qualify	CFUCC	did not participate	CCC	did not participate			5,003
2006	2	USL First Division	6th	Quarter-Finals	CFUCC	Group stage	CCC	did not participate			5,378
2007	2	USL First Division	6th	Semi-Finals	CFUCC	3rd place	CCC	did not qualify			4,725
2008	2	USL First Division	1st	Runner-up	CFUCC	3rd place	CCC	did not qualify	CCL	Semi-Finals	4,423
2009	2	USL First Division	3rd	Semi-Finals	CFUCC	Runner-up	CCL	Group stage			3,293
2010	2	USSF D-2 Pro League	8th, Overall; 5th, USL	Champions	CFUCC	Champions	CCL	Group stage			2,358
2011	2	North American Soccer League	2nd	Semi-Finals	CFUCC	Champions	CCL	Preliminary round			2,161
2012	2	North American Soccer League	3rd	Quarter-Finals	CFUCC	3rd place	CCL	Group stage			1,864
