= History of women in Puerto Rico =

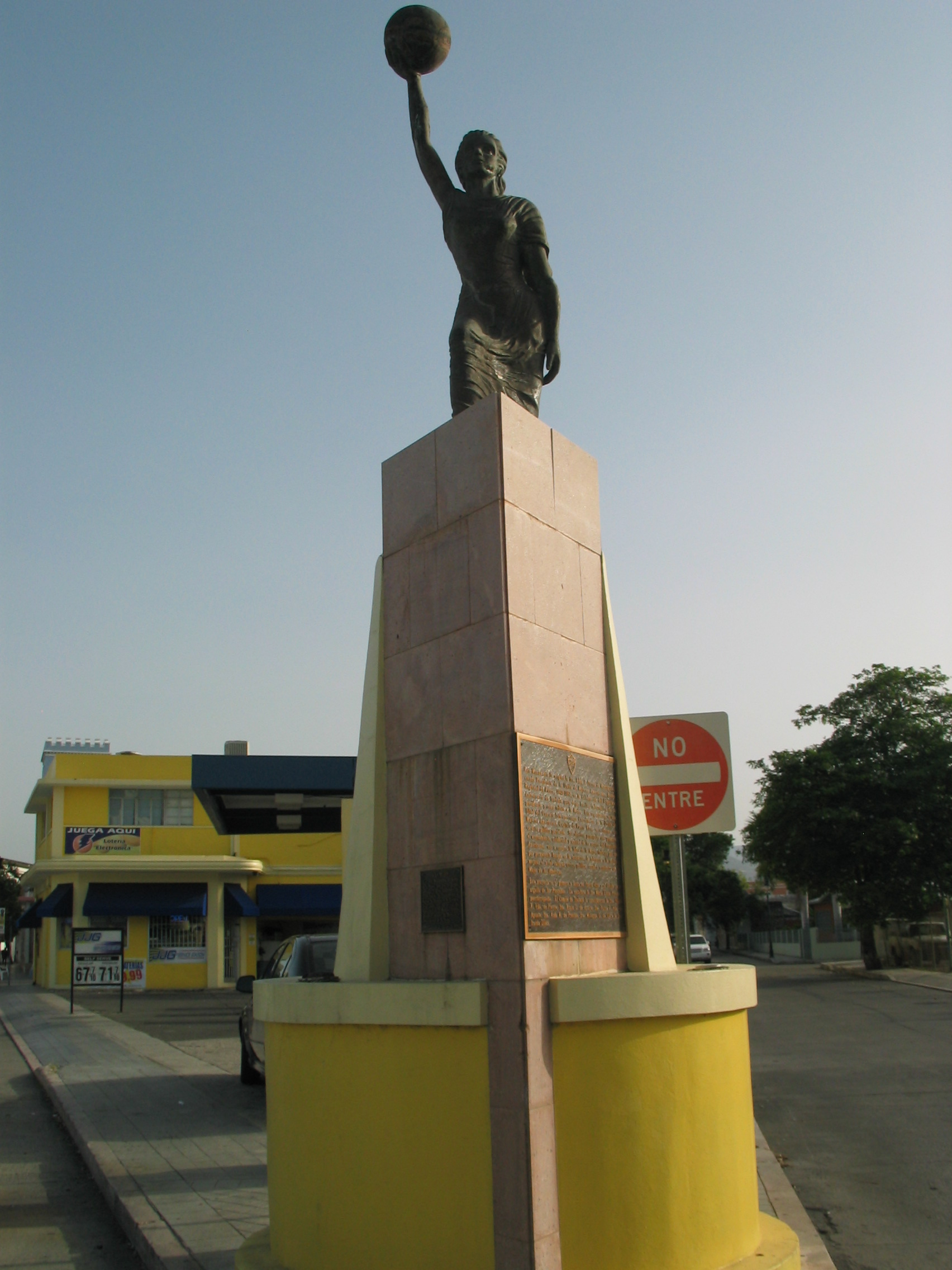
- Monumento a la Mujer; Monument to Women

Total population
- 1,940,618 (females)

Languages
- Spanish and English

Religion
- Predominantly Roman Catholic, Protestant

Related ethnic groups
- Europeans, Africans, Taínos, Criollos, Mestizos, Mulattos

The recorded history of Puerto Rican women can trace its roots back to the era of the Taíno, the indigenous people of the Caribbean, who inhabited the island that they called Borinquen before the arrival of Spaniards. During the Spanish colonization the cultures and customs of the Taíno, Spanish, African and women from non-Hispanic European countries blended into what became the culture and customs of Puerto Rico.

In the early part of the 19th century the women in Puerto Rico were Spanish subjects and had few individual rights. Those who belonged to the upper class of the Spanish ruling society had better educational opportunities than those who did not. However, there were many women who were already active participants in the labor movement and in the agricultural economy of the island.

After Puerto Rico was ceded to the United States in 1898 as a result of the Spanish–American War, women once again played an integral role in Puerto Rican society by contributing to the establishment of the University of Puerto Rico, women's suffrage, women's rights, civil rights, and to the military of the United States.

During the period of industrialization of the 1950s, many women in Puerto Rico found employment in the needle industry, working as seamstresses in garment factories. Many Puerto Rican families also migrated to the United States in the 1950s.

According to the Supreme Court of Puerto Rico, women who are born to Puerto Rican parents in the United States or elsewhere, are considered to be Puerto Rican citizens. On November 18, 1997, the Supreme Court of Puerto Rico, through its ruling in Miriam J. Ramirez de Ferrer v. Juan Mari Brás, reaffirmed the standing existence of the Puerto Rican citizenship. Since 2007, the Government of Puerto Rico has been issuing "Certificates of Puerto Rican Citizenship" to anyone born in Puerto Rico or to anyone born outside of Puerto Rico with at least one parent who was born in Puerto Rico.

Currently, women in Puerto Rico and outside of Puerto Rico have become active participants in the political and social landscape in both, their homeland and in the continental United States. Many of them are involved in the fields that were once limited to the male population and have thus, become influential leaders in their fields.

== Pre-Columbian era (up to 1493) ==
Cacica (Chief) Taina

Puerto Rico was originally called "Borinquen" by the Taínos, which means: "La tierra del altivo Señor", or "The Land of the Mighty Lord", The Taínos were one of the Arawak peoples of South America and the Caribbean, who inhabited the island before the arrival of the Spaniards.

=== The Taíno women ===
The Taíno women cooked, tended to the needs of the family, their farms and harvested crops. According to Ivonne Figueroa, editor of the El Boricua cultural magazine, women who were mothers carried their babies on their backs on a padded board that was secured to the baby's forehead. Women did not dedicate themselves solely to cooking and the art of motherhood; many were also talented artists and made pots, grills, and griddles from river clay by rolling the clay into rope and then layering it to form or shape. Taíno women also carved drawings (petroglyphs) into stone or wood. The Taína's were also warriors and could join the men in battle against the Caribs. According to the Spanish conquistadores, the Carib Indians were cannibals who regularly ate roasted human flesh. Archaeological evidence indicates that they limited the consumption of humans to ceremonial occasions. Even though the men were allowed to have more than one wife, most of them didn't. The cacique (tribal chief) was the only person who could afford to sustain multiple wives. It was a great honor for a woman to be married to a cacique. Not only did she enjoy a materially superior lifestyle, but her children were held in high esteem. According to an observation made by doctor Diego Alvarez Chanca, who accompanied Columbus on his second voyage:

The Taina women made blankets, hammocks, petticoats (Naguas) of cloth and lace. She also weaved baskets. Single women walked around naked while married women wore a Nagua (na·guas), as petticoats were called, to cover their genitals.

The naguas were a long cotton skirt that the woman made. The native women and girls wore the naguas without a top. They were representative of each woman's status, the longer the skirt, the higher the woman's status. The villages of the Taínos were known as "Yucayeque" and were ruled by a cacique. When a cacique died, the next in line to become a chief was the oldest son of the sister of the deceased cacique. Some Taíno women became notable caciques (tribal chiefs). According to Puerto Rican folklore such was the case of Yuisa (Luisa), a cacica in the region near Loíza, which was later named after her.

== Spanish colonial era (1493–1898) ==
The Spanish Conquistadores were soldiers who arrived on the island without women. This contributed to many of them marrying the native Taína. The peace between the Spaniards and the Taínos was short-lived. The Spaniards took advantage of the Taínos' good faith and enslaved them, forcing them to work in the gold mines and in the construction of forts. Many Taínos died as a result either of the cruel treatment that they had received or of smallpox, which became an epidemic in the island. Other Taínos committed suicide or left the island after the failed Taíno revolt of 1511. Some Taino women were raped by the Spaniards while others were taken as common-law wives, resulting in mestizo children.

=== Women from Spain ===
The La Rogativa sculpture portrays three women and a priest participating in a procession that discouraged the British from invading the island.

Spain encouraged the settlement of Puerto Rico by offering and making certain concessions to families who were willing to settle the new colony. Many farmers moved to the island with their families and together with the help of their wives developed the land's agriculture. High ranking government and military officials also settled the island and made Puerto Rico their home. The women in Puerto Rico were commonly known for their roles as mothers and housekeepers. They contributed to the household income by sewing and selling the clothes that they created. Women's rights were unheard of and their contributions to the island's society were limited.

The island, which depended on an agricultural economy, had an illiteracy rate of over 80% at the beginning of the 19th century. Most women were home educated. The first library in Puerto Rico was established in 1642, in the Convent of San Francisco, access to its books was limited to those who belonged to the religious order. The only women who had access to the libraries and who could afford books were the wives and daughters of Spanish government officials or wealthy land owners. Those who were poor had to resort to oral story-telling in what are traditionally known in Puerto Rico as Coplas and Decimas.

Despite these limitations the women of Puerto Rico were proud of their homeland and helped defend it against foreign invaders. According to a popular Puerto Rican legend, when the British troops lay siege to San Juan, Puerto Rico, the night of April 30, 1797, the townswomen, led by a bishop, formed a rogativa (prayer procession) and marched throughout the streets of the city singing hymns, carrying torches, and praying for the deliverance of the city. Outside the walls, particularly from the sea, the British navy mistook this torch-lit religious parade for the arrival of Spanish reinforcements. When morning arrived, the British were gone from the island, and the city was saved from a possible invasion.

=== Women from Africa ===
The Spanish colonists, feared the loss of their Taino labor force due to the protests of Friar Bartolomé de las Casas at the council of Burgos at the Spanish Court. The friar was outraged at the Spanish treatment of the Taíno and was able to secure their rights and freedom. The colonists protested before the Spanish courts. They complained that they needed manpower to work in the mines, the fortifications and the thriving sugar industry. As an alternative, the friar suggested the importation and use of enslaved Africans. In 1517, the Spanish Crown permitted its subjects to import twelve slaves each, thereby beginning the slave trade in their colonies.

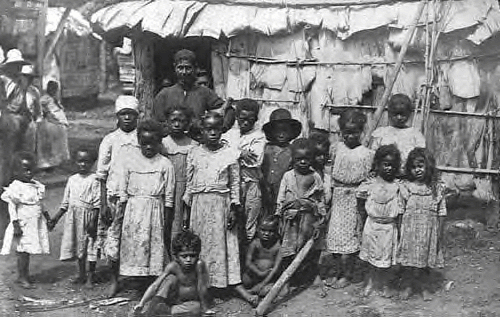
Former enslaved African with her children (1898)

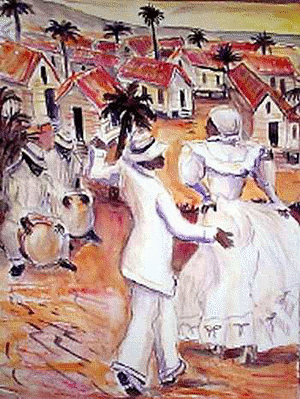
The painting Baile De Loiza Aldea, by artist Antonio Broccoli Porto, portrays a Puerto Rican woman of African descent dancing to bomba

According to historian Luis M. Diaz, the largest contingent of African slaves came from the Gold Coast, Nigeria, and Dahomey, and the region known as the area of Guineas, the Slave Coast. However, the vast majority were Yorubas and Igbos, ethnic groups from Nigeria, and Bantus from the Guineas.

Most African women were forced to work in the fields picking fruits and/or cotton. Those who worked in the master's house did so as maids or nannies. In 1789, the Spanish Crown issued the "Royal Decree of Graces of 1789", also known as "El Código Negro" (The Black code). In accordance to "El Código Negro" the slave could buy his freedom. Those who did became known as "freeman" or "freewoman". On March 22, 1873, the Spanish National Assembly finally abolished slavery in Puerto Rico. The owners were compensated with 35 million pesetas per slave, and the former slaves were required to work for their former masters for three more years.

The influence of the African culture began to make itself felt on the island. They introduced a mixture of Portuguese, Spanish, and the language spoken in the Congo in what is known as "Bozal" Spanish. They also introduced what became the typical dances of Puerto Rico such as the Bomba and the Plena, which are likewise rooted in Africa. African women also contributed to the development of Puerto Rican cuisine that has a strong African influence. The melange of flavors that make up the typical Puerto Rican cuisine counts with the African touch. Pasteles, small bundles of meat stuffed into a dough made of grated green banana (sometimes combined with pumpkin, potatoes, plantains, or yautía) and wrapped in plantain leaves, were devised by African women on the island and based upon food products that originated in Africa.

One of the first Afro-Puerto Rican women to gain notability was Celestina Cordero, a "freewoman", who in 1820, founded the first school for girls in San Juan. Despite the fact that she was subject to racial discrimination for being a black free woman, she continued to pursue her goal to teach others regardless of their race and or social standing. After several years of struggling her school was officially recognized by the Spanish government as an educational institution. By the second half of the 19th century the Committee of Ladies of Honor of the Economical Society of Friends of Puerto Rico (Junta de Damas de Honor de la Sociedad Económica de Amigos del País) or the Association of Ladies for the Instruction of Women (Asociacion de Damas para la instruccion de la Mujer) were established.

=== Women from non-Hispanic Europe ===
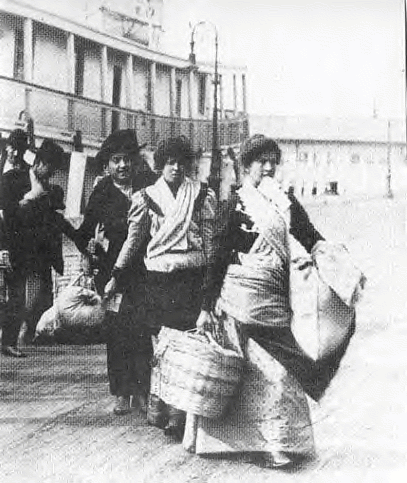
Early Irish women, such as the ones pictured, immigrated to the Americas, including Puerto Rico, in the 1850s.

In the early 1800s, the Spanish Crown decided that one of the ways to curb pro-independence tendencies surfacing at the time in Puerto Rico was to allow Europeans of non-Spanish origin to settle the island. Therefore, the Royal Decree of Graces of 1815 was printed in three languages, Spanish, English and French. Those who immigrated to Puerto Rico were given free land and a "Letter of Domicile" with the condition that they swore loyalty to the Spanish Crown and allegiance to the Roman Catholic Church. After residing in the island for five years the settlers were granted a "Letter of Naturalization" that made them Spanish subjects.

Hundreds of women from Corsica, France, Ireland, Germany and other regions moved and settled in Puerto Rico with their families. These families were instrumental in the development of Puerto Rico's tobacco, cotton and sugar industries. Many of the women eventually intermarried into the local population, adopting the language and customs of their new homeland. Their influence in Puerto Rico is very much present and in evidence in the island's cuisine, literature and arts.

A good example of their contributions to the culture of Puerto Rico is Edna Coll, a Puerto Rican of Irish descent. She was an educator, author and one of the founders of the Academy of Fine Arts in Puerto Rico. The cultural customs and traditions of the women who immigrated to Puerto Rico from non-Hispanic nations blended in with those of the Taino, Spanish and African to become what is now the culture, customs and traditions of Puerto Rico.

=== Early literary, civil, and political leaders ===
During the 19th century, women in Puerto Rico began to express themselves through their literary work. Among them was María Bibiana Benítez, Puerto Rico's first poet and playwright. In 1832, she published her first poem La Ninfa de Puerto Rico (The Nymph of Puerto Rico). Her niece, Alejandrina Benitez de Gautier, has been recognized as one of the island's great poets. The two female contributors to Aguinaldo puertorriqueño (Ode to Puerto Rico) (1843), are Alejandrina Benitez de Gautier and Benicia Aguayo. It is the first book dedicated exclusively to Puerto Rican authors. Other notable Puerto Rican female writers of the 19th century include poet Fidela Matheu y Adrián (1852–1927), poet Ursula Cardona de Quiñones, who mentored Lola Rodriquez de Tio, playwright Carmen Hernández Araujo (1832–1877) who wrote her first drama at the age of fifteen, novelist Carmela Eulate Sanjurjo, and social labor organizer and writer Luisa Capetillo. These women expressed their patriotic and social demands through their writing.

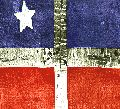
The first Puerto Rican Flag, the Lares revolutionary flag of 1868, knitted by Mariana Bracetti

Puerto Rican women also expressed themselves against the political injustices practiced in the island against the people of Puerto Rico by the Spanish Crown. The critical state of the economy, together with the growing repression imposed by the Spaniards, served as catalysts for rebellion. Submission and dependence were key ingredients in the colonial formula. In order to guarantee colonial order, it was made sure that women obeyed the laws of the church and the state. Elite women were not allowed to actively participate in politics under colonial rule.

Some women embraced the revolutionary cause of Puerto Rican independence. There was also an emergence of women's organizations in an attempt to face the island's economic uncertainty. Laundresses organized on several occasions to demand proper working conditions, which presented a potential threat to the colonial establishment. Literary discussion groups for women emerged, convening in the homes of intellectual women, Tensions rose in 1857 when there was a dispute between the laundresses and the mayor of the now defunct town of San Mateo de Cangrejos (Note: The town of San Mateo de Cangrejos was annexed by the City of San Juan in 1862)

In the 19th century, the number of magazines and publications published and distributed by, about, and for elite and professional women increased in San Juan. These publications included La Guirnalda Puertorriqueña (1856), Las Brisas de Borinquén (1864), and La Azucena (1870). These publications were the origin of the relationship between elite women, bourgeois feminism, and journalism.

After the abolition of slavery, the recently freed women of African heritage moved to urban areas with little tolerance for social and labor control. The first Puerto Rican woman who is known to have become an Independentista and who struggled for Puerto Rico's independence from Spanish colonialism, was María de las Mercedes Barbudo. Joining forces with the Venezuelan government, under the leadership of Simon Bolivar, Barbudo organized an insurrection against Spanish rule in Puerto Rico. However, her plans were discovered by the Spanish authorities, which resulted in her arrest and exile from Puerto Rico.

In 1868, many Puerto Rican women participated in the uprising known as El Grito de Lares. Among the notable women who directly or indirectly participated in the revolt and who became part of Puerto Rican legend and lore were Lola Rodríguez de Tio and Mariana Bracetti.

External audio
- You may listen to Rodríguez de Tió's version of the "La Borinqueña" on YouTube interpreted by Puerto Rican singer Danny Rivera.

Lola Rodríguez de Tio believed in equal rights for women, the abolition of slavery and actively participated in the Puerto Rican Independence Movement. She wrote the revolutionary lyrics to La Borinqueña, Puerto Rico's national anthem. Mariana Bracetti, also known as Brazo de Oro (Golden Arm), was the sister-in-law of revolution leader Manuel Rojas and actively participated in the revolt. Bracetti knitted the first Puerto Rican flag, the Lares Revolutionary Flag. The flag was proclaimed the national flag of the "Republic of Puerto Rico" by Francisco Ramírez Medina, who was sworn in as Puerto Rico's first president, and placed on the high altar of the Catholic Church of Lares. Upon the failure of the revolution, Bracetti was imprisoned in Arecibo along with the other survivors, but was later released.

== American colonial era (1898–present) ==
Puerto Rico became an unincorporated territory of the United States or an American colony as defined by the United Nations decolonization committee after Spain ceded the island to the United States. This was in accordance with the Treaty of Paris of 1898 after the Spanish–American War.

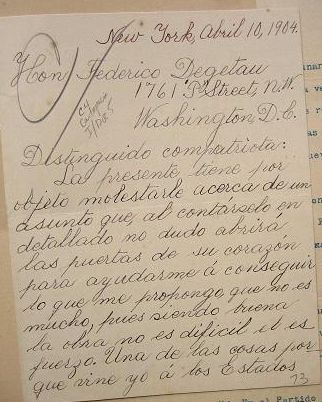
Letter written by Isabel Gonzalez to Federico Degetau in April 1904

Soon after the U.S. assumed control of the island, the United States government believed that overpopulation of the island would lead to disastrous social and economic conditions, and instituted public policies aimed at controlling the rapid growth of the population. To deal with this situation, in 1907 the U.S. instituted a public policy that gave the state the right "to sterilize unwilling and unwitting people". The passage of Puerto Rico Law 116 in 1937, codified the island government's population control program. This program was designed by the Eugenics Board and both U.S. government funds and contributions from private individuals supported the initiative. However, instead of providing Puerto Rican women with access to alternative forms of safe, legal and reversible contraception, the U.S. policy promoted the use of permanent sterilization. The US-driven Puerto Rican measure was so overly charged that women of childbearing age in Puerto Rico were more than 10 times more likely to be sterilized than were women from the U.S.

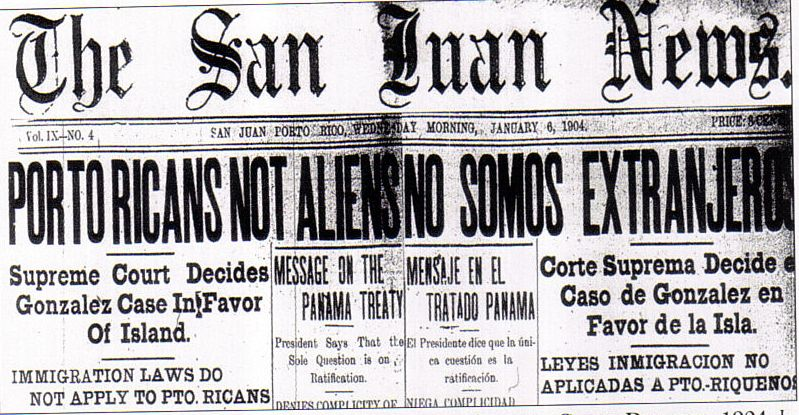
Cover of The San Juan News announcing the decision on Gonzales v. Williams in which Puerto Ricans were not declared to be alien immigrants when traveling to the United States. The case was argued in court by Isabel González, a Puerto Rican woman.

From 1898 to 1917, many Puerto Rican women who wished to travel to the United States suffered discrimination. Such was the case of Isabel González, a young unwed pregnant woman who planned to join and marry the father of her unborn child in New York City. Her plans were derailed by the United States Treasury Department, when she was excluded as an alien "likely to become a public charge" upon her arrival to New York City. González challenged the Government of the United States in the groundbreaking case Gonzales v. Williams (192 U.S. 1 (1904). Officially the case was known as "Isabella Gonzales, Appellant, vs. William Williams, United States Commissioner of Immigration at the Port of New York" No. 225, and was argued on December 4 and 7 of 1903, and decided January 4, 1904. Her case was an appeal from the Circuit Court of the United States for the Southern District of New York, filed February 27, 1903, after also having her Writ of Habeas Corpus (HC. 1–187) dismissed. Her Supreme Court case is the first time that the Court confronted the citizenship status of inhabitants of territories acquired by the United States. González actively pursued the cause of U.S. citizenship for all Puerto Ricans by writing and publishing letters in The New York Times.

The Americanization process of Puerto Rico also hindered the educational opportunities for the women of Puerto Rico since teachers were imported from the United States and schools were not allowed to conduct their instruction using the Spanish language. Women who belonged to the wealthier families were able to attend private schools either in Spain or the United States, but those who were less fortunate worked as housewives, in domestic jobs, or in the so-called needle industry. Women such as Nilita Vientós Gastón, defended the use of the Spanish language in schools and in the courts of Puerto Rico, before the Supreme Court, and won. Nilita Vientós Gaston was an educator, writer, journalist and later became the first female lawyer to work for the Department of Justice of Puerto Rico.

=== Suffrage and women's rights ===
Women such as Ana Roque de Duprey opened the academic doors for the women in the island. In 1884, Roque was offered a teacher's position in Arecibo, which she accepted. She also enrolled at the Provincial Institute where she studied philosophy and science and earned her bachelor's degree. Roque de Duprey was a suffragist who founded La Mujer, the first "women's only" magazine in Puerto Rico. She was one of the founders of the University of Puerto Rico in 1903. From 1903 to 1923, three of every four University of Puerto Rico graduates were women who passed the teachers training course and become teachers in the island's schools.

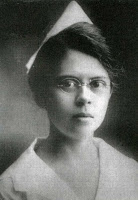
Rosa A. González

As in most countries, women were not allowed to vote in public elections. The University of Puerto Rico graduated many women who became interested in improving female influence in civic and political areas. This resulted in a significant increase in women who became teachers and educators but also in the emergence of female leaders in the suffragist and women's rights movements. Among the women who became educators and made notable contributions to the educational system of the island were Concha Meléndez, the first woman to belong to the Puerto Rican Academy of Languages, Pilar Barbosa, a professor at the University of Puerto Rico who was the first modern-day Official Historian of Puerto Rico, and Ana G. Méndez founder of the Ana G. Mendez University System in Puerto Rico.

Women's rights, in the early 1900s, opened the doors of opportunity for the women of Puerto Rico making it possible for them to work in positions and professions which were traditionally occupied by men, including the medical profession. The first female medical practitioners in the island were María Elisa Rivera Díaz and Ana Janer who established their practices in 1909 and Palmira Gatell who established her practice in 1910. Ana Janer and María Elisa Rivera Díaz graduated in the same medical school class in 1909 and thus could both be considered the first female Puerto Rican physicians. María Elisa Rivera Díaz, Ana Janer and Palmira Gatell were followed by Dolores Mercedes Piñero, who earned her medical degree from the College of Physicians and Surgeons in Boston in 1913. She was the first Puerto Rican female doctor to serve under contract in the U.S. Army during World War I. During the war, Piñero helped establish a hospital in Puerto Rico which took care of the soldiers who had contracted the swine flu.

Many women also worked as nurses, bearing the burden of improving public health on the island. In 1914, Rosa A. González earned a degree in nursing, established various health clinics throughout Puerto Rico and was the founder of The Association of Registered Nurses of Puerto Rico. González authored two books related to her field in which she denounced the discrimination against women and nurses in Puerto Rico. In her books she quoted the following:

In our country any man who is active in a political party, will be considered capable of handling an administrative position, regardless of how inept he is.

To this day the "Medical Class" has not accepted nurses who have the same goal as doctors: the well-being of the patient. Both professions need each other in order to be successful.

In her book Los hechos desconocidos (The unknown facts) she denounced the corruption, abuses and unhealthy practices in the municipal hospital of San Juan. Gonzale's publication convinced James R. Beverly, the Interim Governor of Puerto Rico, to sign Ley 77 (Law 77) in May 1930. The law established a Nurses Examining Board responsible for setting and enforcing standards of nursing education and practices. It also stipulated that the Board of Medical Examiners include two nurses. The passage of Ley 77 proved that women can operate both in the formal public sphere while working in a female oriented field. In 1978, González became the first recipient of the Public Health Department of Puerto Rico "Garrido Morales Award".

In the early 1900s, women also became involved in the labor movement. During a farm workers' strike in 1905, Luisa Capetillo wrote propaganda and organized the workers in the strike. She quickly became a leader of the "FLT" (American Federation of Labor) and traveled throughout Puerto Rico educating and organizing women. Her hometown of Arecibo became the most unionized area of the country. In 1908, during the "FLT" convention, Capetillo asked the union to approve a policy for women's suffrage. She insisted that all women should have the same right to vote as men. Capetillo is considered to be one of Puerto Rico's first suffragists. In 1912, Capetillo traveled to New York City where she organized Cuban and Puerto Rican tobacco workers. Later on, she traveled to Tampa, Florida, where she also organized workers. In Florida, she published the second edition of "Mi Opinión". She also traveled to Cuba and the Dominican Republic, where she joined the striking workers in their cause. In 1919, she challenged the mainstream society by becoming the first woman in Puerto Rico to wear pants in public. Capetillo was sent to jail for what was then considered to be a "crime", but the judge later dropped the charges against her. In that same year, along with other labor activists, she helped pass a minimum-wage law in the Puerto Rican Legislature.

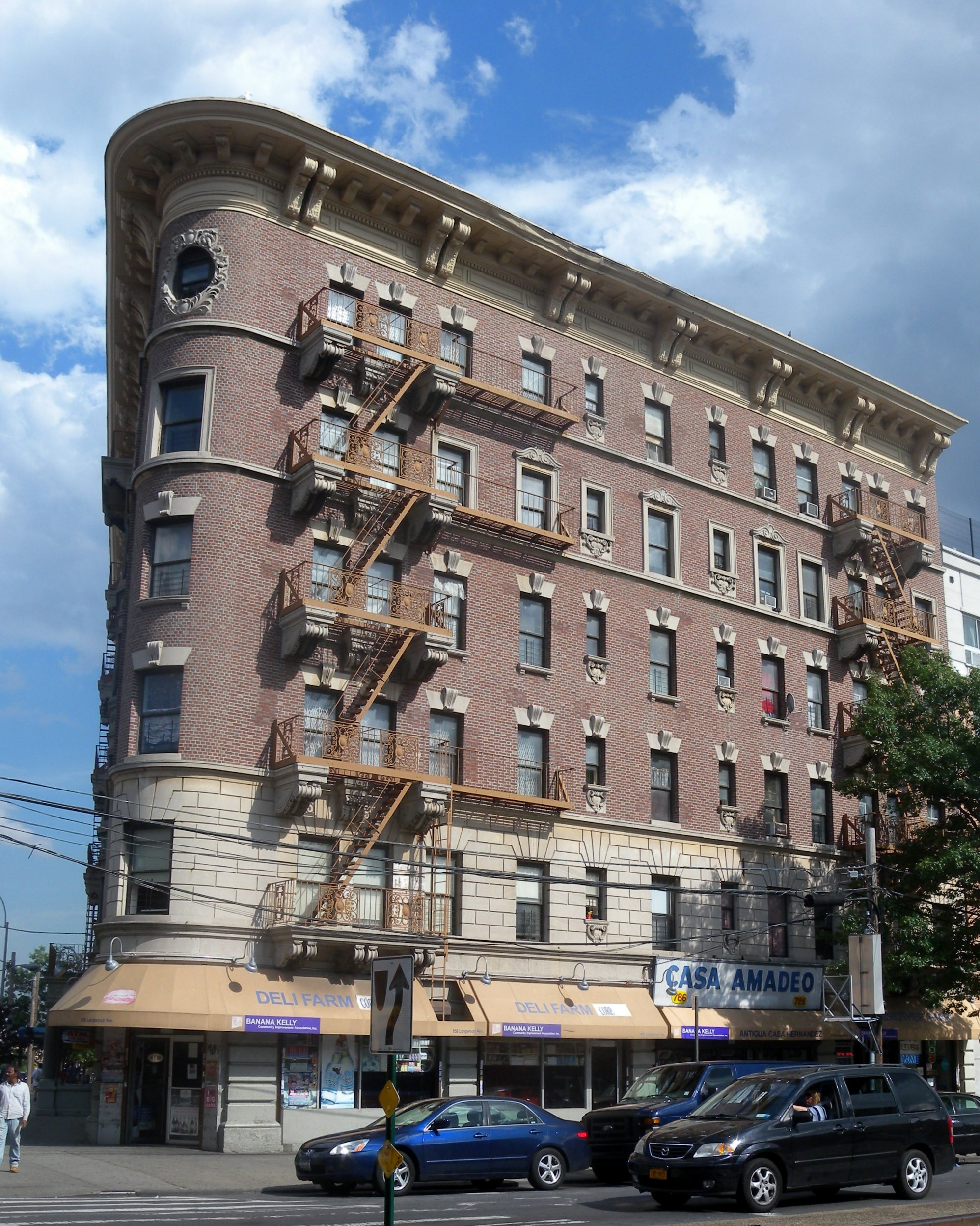
Building where Victoria Hernández had her business. The Casa Amadeo, antigua Casa Hernandez was listed in the National Register of Historic Places on March 23, 2001 (reference#01000244)

When World War I ended Victoria Hernández, the sister of composer Rafael Hernández, moved to New York City to join both of her brothers who were recently discharged from the Army. She found a job as a seamstress in a factory and in her spare time she taught embroidery. In 1927, Victoria established a music store called "Almacenes Hernández" in El Barrio at 1735 Madison Avenue. She thus, became the first female Puerto Rican to own a music store in New York City. Her business continued to grow and this placed her in a position where she could act as a liaison between the major record companies and the Latino community and as such serve as a booking agent for many Puerto Rican musicians. Hernández began her own record label, however she was forced to close her business because of the Great Depression in 1929. She moved to Mexico, but returned to New York in 1941. She established another record store that she named Casa Hernández at 786 Prospect Ave. in the South Bronx. There she also sold clothes and gave piano lessons. She lost interest in the music business after the death of her brother Rafael, in 1965, and in 1969, sold her business to Mike Amadeo, a fellow Puerto Rican. The building, now known as Casa Amadeo, antigua Casa Hernandez, houses the oldest, continuously occupied Latin music store in the Bronx. It was listed in the National Register of Historic Places on March 23, 2001 (reference #01000244).

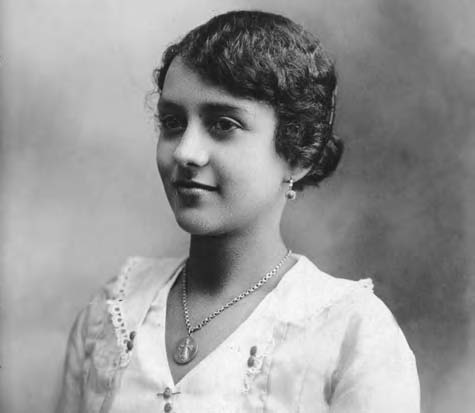
Community organizer Rufa Concepción Fernández "Concha" Colón (1903–1958), in 1925

The two sisters of Antonio Paoli, a world renowned Puerto Rican Opera Tenor, Olivia Paoli (1855–1942), an activist and her sister Amalia Paoli (1861–1941) a notable Opera Soprano, were suffragists who fought for the equal rights of the women in Puerto Rico. Olivia was also one of the architects of the Puerto Rico's suffrage campaign from the 1920s, participating in the Social Suffragette League, of which she was its vice president. Olivia was the founder of the first Theosophist lodge in Puerto Rico on December 31, 1906.

On January 29, 1925, Rufa "Concha" Concepción Fernández, arrived in New York City. She married Jesús Colón a political activist and acted as his secretary. She then became politically active and assisted in the founding of various community organizations. According to the Colón papers, she became the secretary of "la Liga Puertorriqueña e Hispana" (The Puerto Rican and Hispanic League), which fostered mutual aid in the collective struggle and solidarity with all Hispanics in New York City. Her work contributed to the growth and acculturation of the New York Puerto Rican community.

In 1929, Puerto Rico's legislature granted women the right to vote, pushed by the United States Congress to do so. Only women who could read and write were enfranchised; however, in 1935, all adult women were enfranchised regardless of their level of literacy. Puerto Rico was the second Latin American country to recognize a woman's right to vote. Both María Cadilla de Martinez and Ana María O'Neill were early advocates of women's rights. Cadilla de Martinez was also one of the first women in Puerto Rico to earn a doctoral (PhD) college degree.

=== Early birth control ===
Clarence Gamble, an American physician, established a network of birth control clinics in Puerto Rico from 1936 to 1939. He believed that Puerto Rican women and the women from other American colonies, did not have the mental capacity and were too poor to understand and use diaphragms for birth control as the women in the United States mainland. He inaugurated a program funded by the Rockefeller Foundation, which would replace the use of diaphragms with foam powders, cremes and spermicidal jellies. He did not know that in the past Rosa Gonzalez had publicly battled with prominent physicians and named her and Carmen Rivera de Alvarez, another nurse who was a Puerto Rican independence advocate, to take charge of the insular birth control program. However, the insular program lacked funding and failed.

=== Puerto Rican women in the U.S. military ===
In 1944, the U.S. Army sent recruiters to the island to recruit no more than 200 women for the Women's Army Corps (WAC). Over 1,000 applications were received for the unit. The Puerto Rican WAC unit, Company 6, 2nd Battalion, 21st Regiment of the Women's Army Auxiliary Corps, a segregated Hispanic unit, was assigned to the New York Port of Embarkation, after their basic training at Fort Oglethorpe, Georgia. They were assigned to work in military offices that planned the shipment of troops around the world.

Among the women recruited was PFC Carmen García Rosado, who in 2006, authored and published a book titled LAS WACS-Participacion de la Mujer Boricua en la Segunda Guerra Mundial (The WACs: The participation of the Puerto Rican women in the Second World War), the first book to document the experiences of the first 200 Puerto Rican women who participated in said conflict. In 1989, she was named consultant to the director of Veterans Affairs in Puerto Rico. In her position she became an activist and worked for the rights of the Puerto Rican women veterans.

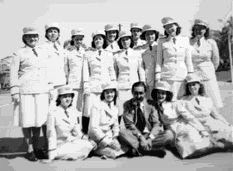
Puerto Rican Army nurses, 296th Station Hospital, Camp Tortuguero, Vega Baja, PR.

That same year the Army Nurse Corps (ANC) decided to accept Puerto Rican nurses so that Army hospitals would not have to deal with the language barriers. Thirteen women submitted applications, were interviewed, underwent physical examinations, and were accepted into the ANC. Eight of these nurses were assigned to the Army Post at San Juan, where they were valued for their bilingual abilities. Five nurses were assigned to work at the hospital at Camp Tortuguero, Puerto Rico. Among the nurses was Second Lieutenant Carmen Lozano Dumler, who became one of the first Puerto Rican female United States Army officers.

Not all the women served as nurses. Some of the women served in administrative duties in the mainland or near combat zones. Such was the case of Technician Fourth Grade (T/4) Carmen Contreras-Bozak who belonged to the 149th Women's Army Auxiliary Corps. The 149th Women's Army Auxiliary Corps (WAAC) Post Headquarters Company was the first WAAC Company to go overseas, setting sail from New York Harbor for Europe in January 1943. The unit arrived in Northern Africa on January 27, 1943, and rendered overseas duties in Algiers within General Dwight D. Eisenhower's theater headquarters, T/4. Carmen Contreras-Bozak, a member of this unit, was the first Hispanic to serve in the U.S. Women's Army Corps as an interpreter and in numerous administrative positions.

Another was Lieutenant Junior Grade (LTJG) María Rodríguez Denton, the first woman from Puerto Rico who became an officer in the United States Navy as a member of the WAVES. The Navy assigned LTJG Denton as a library assistant at the Cable and Censorship Office in New York City. It was LTJG Denton who forwarded the news (through channels) to President Harry S. Truman that the war had ended.

Some Puerto Rican women who served in the military went on to become notable in fields outside of the military. Among them are Sylvia Rexach, a composer of boleros, Marie Teresa Rios, an author, and Julita Ross, a singer.

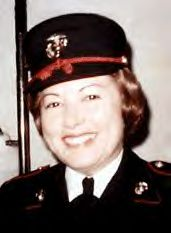
CWO3 Rose Franco

Sylvia Rexach, dropped out of the University of Puerto Rico in 1942 and joined the United States Army as a member of the WACS where she served as an office clerk. She served until 1945, when she was honorably discharged. Marie Teresa Rios was a Puerto Rican writer who also served in World War II. Rios, mother of Medal of Honor recipient, Capt. Humbert Roque Versace and author of The Fifteenth Pelican, which was the basis for the popular 1960s television sitcom "The Flying Nun", drove Army trucks and buses. She also served as a pilot for the Civil Air Patrol. Rios Versace wrote and edited for various newspapers around the world, including places such as Guam, Germany, Wisconsin, and South Dakota, and publications such the Armed Forces Star & Stripes and Gannett. During World War II, Julita Ross entertained the troops with her voice in "USO shows" (United Service Organizations).

Chief Warrant Officer (CWO3) Rose Franco, was the first Puerto Rican woman to become a Warrant Officer in the United States Marine Corps. With the outbreak of the Korean War, Franco surprised her family by announcing that she was leaving college to join the United States Marine Corps. In 1965, Franco was named Administrative Assistant to the Secretary of the Navy Paul Henry Nitze by the administration of President Lyndon B. Johnson.

=== Puerto Rican women in the revolt against United States rule ===
In the 1930s, the Puerto Rican Nationalist Party became the largest independence group in Puerto Rico. Under the leadership of Pedro Albizu Campos, the party opted against electoral participation and advocated violent revolution. The women's branch of the Puerto Rican Nationalist Party was called the Daughters of Freedom. Some of the militants of this women's-only organization included Julia de Burgos, one of Puerto Rico's greatest poets.

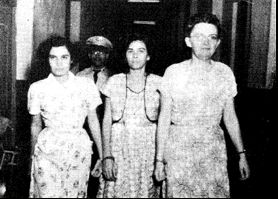
The arrest of Carmen María Pérez Gonzalez, Olga Viscal Garriga, and Ruth Mary Reynolds; three women involved with the Puerto Rican Nationalist Party who were arrested because of violations to the Ley de la Mordaza (Gag Law). The law was later repealed as it was considered unconstitutional.

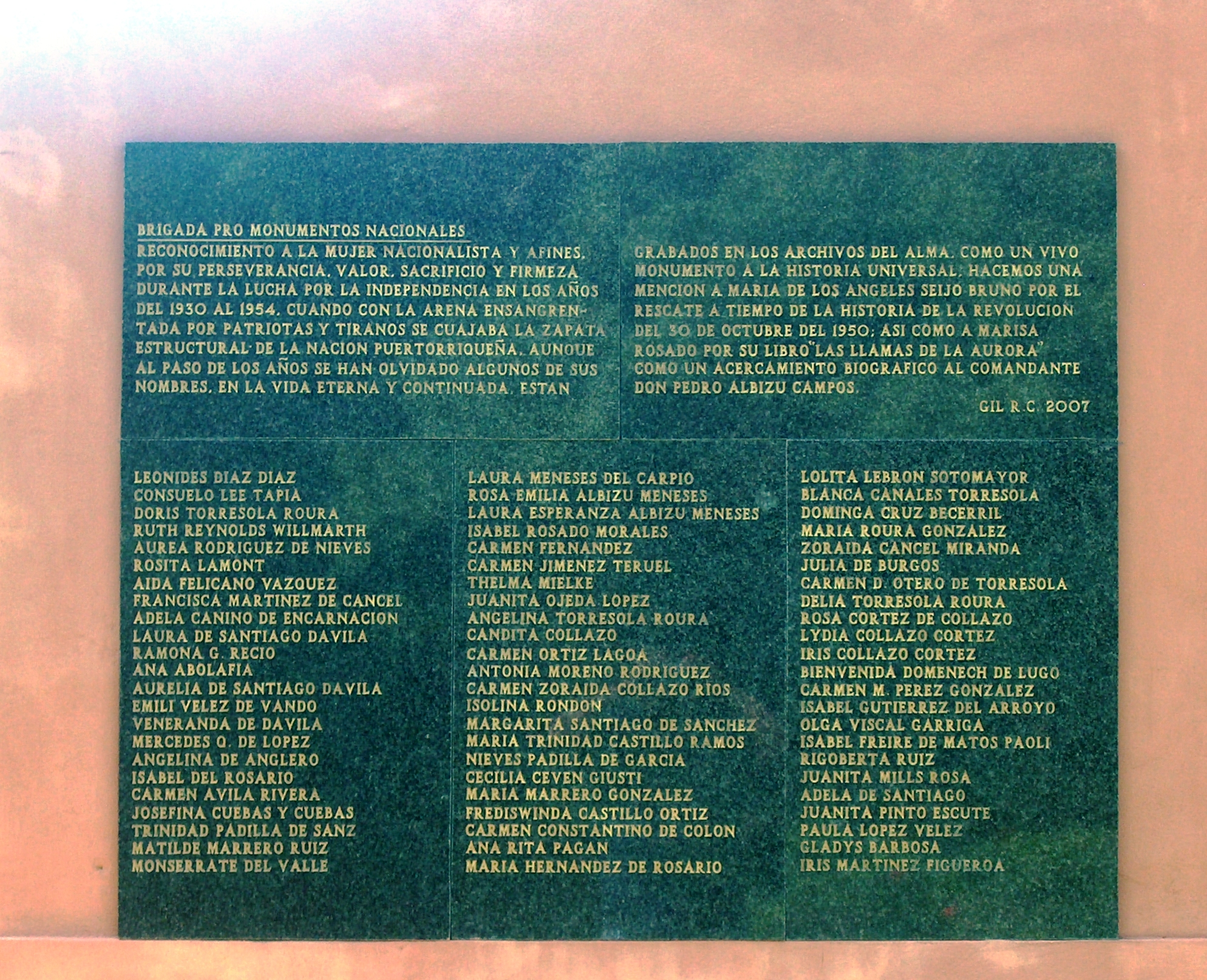
Plaque honoring the women of the Puerto Rican Nationalist Party.

Various confrontations took place in the 1930s in which Nationalist Party partisans were involved and that led to a call for an uprising against the United States and the eventual attack of the United States House of Representatives in 1954. One of the most violent incidents was the 1937 Ponce massacre, in which police officers fired upon Nationalists who were participating in a peaceful demonstration against American abuse of authority. About 100 civilians were wounded and 19 were killed, among them, a woman, Maria Hernández del Rosario, and a seven-year-old child, Georgina Maldonado.

On October 30, 1950, the Nationalist Party called for a revolt against the United States. Known as the Puerto Rican Nationalist Party Revolts of the 1950s, uprisings were held in the towns of Ponce, Mayagüez, Naranjito, Arecibo, Utuado, San Juan and most notably in Jayuya, which became known as the Jayuya Uprising. Various women who were members of the Nationalist Party, but who did not participate in the revolts were falsely accused by the US Government of participating in the revolts and arrested. Among them Isabel Rosado, a social worker and Olga Viscal Garriga, a student leader and spokesperson of the Puerto Rican Nationalist Party's branch in Río Piedras. Other women who were leaders of the movement were Isabel Freire de Matos, Isolina Rondón and Rosa Collazo.

The military intervened and the revolts came to an end after three days on September 2. Two of the most notable women, who bore arms against the United States, were Blanca Canales and Lolita Lebrón.

Blanca Canales is best known for leading the Jayuya Revolt. Canales led her group to the town's plaza where she raised the Puerto Rican flag and declared Puerto Rico to be a Republic. She was arrested and accused of killing a police officer and wounding three others. She was also accused of burning down the local post office. She was sentenced to life imprisonment plus sixty years of jail. In 1967, Canales was given a full pardon by Puerto Rican Governor Roberto Sanchez Vilella.

Lolita Lebrón was the leader of a group of nationalists who attacked the United States House of Representatives in 1954. She presented her attack plan to the New York branch of the Puerto Rican Nationalist Party where Rosa Collazo served as treasurer. Lebrón's mission was to bring world attention to Puerto Rico's independence cause. When Lebrón's group reached the visitor's gallery above the chamber in the House, she stood up and shouted "¡Viva Puerto Rico Libre!" ("Long live a Free Puerto Rico!") and unfurled a Puerto Rican flag. Then the group opened fire with automatic pistols. A popular legend claims that Lebrón fired her shots at the ceiling and missed. In 1979, under international pressure, President Jimmy Carter pardoned Lolita Lebrón and two members of her group, Irvin Flores and Rafael Cancel Miranda.

=== The Great Migration ===
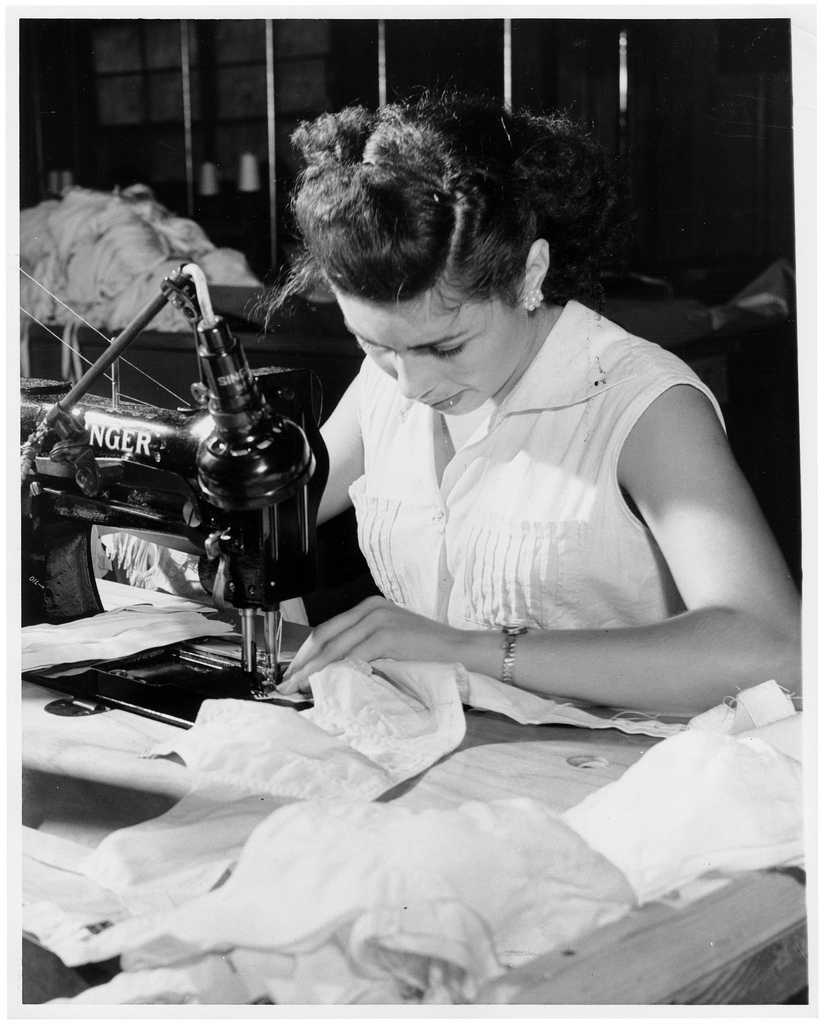
A woman in a Puerto Rico garment factory (c. 1950)

The 1950s saw a phenomenon that became known as "The Great Migration", where thousands of Puerto Ricans, including entire families of men, women and their children, left the Island and moved to the states, the bulk of them to New York City. Several factors led to the migration, among them the Great Depression of the 1930s, World War II in the 1940s, and the advent of commercial air travel in the 1950s.

The Great Depression, which spread throughout the world, was also felt in Puerto Rico. Since the island's economy has been dependent on the economy of the United States, when American banks and industries began to fail the effect was also felt in the island. Unemployment was on the rise as a consequence and many families fled to the mainland U.S. in search of jobs.

The outbreak of World War II opened the doors to many of the migrants who were searching for jobs. Since a large portion of the male population of the U.S. was sent to war, there was a sudden need of manpower to fulfill the jobs left behind. Puerto Ricans, both male and female, found themselves employed in factories and ship docks, producing both domestic and warfare goods. The new migrants gained the knowledge and working skills that became useful even after the war had ended. For the first time the military also provided a steady source of income for women.

The advent of air travel provided Puerto Ricans with an affordable and faster way of travel to New York and other cities in the U.S. One of the things that most of the migrants had in common was that they wanted a better way of life than was available in Puerto Rico and although each held personal reasons for migrating their decision generally was rooted in the island's impoverished conditions as well as the public policies that sanctioned migration.

==== Impact in the U.S. educational system ====
Many Puerto Rican women have made important contributions to the educational system in the United States. Some contributed in the field of education, another was responsible in ending de jure segregation in the United States. Yet, another educator made the ultimate sacrifice and gave her life for her students.

One of the migrants was Antonia Pantoja. Pantoja's was an educator, social worker, feminist, civil rights leader, founder of the Puerto Rican Forum, Boricua College, Producer and founder of ASPIRA. ASPIRA (Spanish for "aspire") is a non-profit organization that promoted a positive self-image, commitment to community, and education as a value as part of the ASPIRA Process to Puerto Rican and other Latino youth in New York City. In 1996, President Bill Clinton presented Pantoja with the Presidential Medal of Freedom, making her the first Puerto Rican woman to receive this honor.

Another Puerto Rican woman whose actions had an impact on the educational system of the United States was Felicitas Mendez (maiden name: Gomez). Mendez, a native of the town of Juncos, became an American civil rights pioneer with her husband Gonzalo, when their children were denied the right to attend an all "white" school in Southern California. In 1946, Mendez and her husband took it upon themselves the task of leading a community battle that changed the educational system in California and set an important legal precedent for ending de jure segregation in the United States. The landmark desegregation case, known as the Mendez v. Westminster case, paved the way for integration and the American civil rights movement.

Victoria Leigh Soto's father was born in the City of Bayamon. On December 14, 2012, Soto was teaching her first grade class at Sandy Hook Elementary School when Adam Lanza forced his way into the school and began to shoot staff and students. After killing fifteen students and two teachers in the first classroom, Lanza entered Soto's classroom. Soto had hidden several children in a closet, and when Lanza entered her classroom, she told him that the children were in the school gym. When several children ran from their hiding places, Lanza began shooting the students. Soto was reportedly shot while trying to shield them with her body.

The three women were honored by the Government of the United States. Pantoja was awarded the Presidential Medal of Freedom, an award bestowed by the president of the United States that is considered the highest civilian award in the United States. Felicitas Mendez, and her husband, Gonzalo were featured on a U.S. postage stamp. Soto was posthumously awarded the Presidential Citizens Medal in 2013, an award bestowed by the president of the United States that is considered the second highest civilian award in the United States, second only to the Presidential Medal of Freedom mentioned before. The medal recognizes individuals "who have performed exemplary deeds or services for his or her country or fellow citizens".

In 2005, Ingrid Montes, a professor in the Department of Chemistry at the University of Puerto Rico, Río Piedras, founded the "Festival de Quimica" (Chemistry Festival). The "Festival de Quimica" is a community outreach program which she created to engage the general public through chemistry demonstrations and its relation to daily life. Since 2013, Montes has been the director-at-large at the American Chemical Society (ACS). The "Festival de Quimica" program, which she founded, was adopted by the ACS in 2010 and in 2016, the ACS festival training was launched around the world.

== Women in the fine arts ==
=== Visual arts ===
Edna Coll was the president of the local chapter of the American League of Professional Artists. She founded the Academy of Fine Arts in Puerto Rico in 1941. The academy, which is now known as the "Academia Edna Coll" (The Edna Coll Academy) and situated in San Juan, has served as the exposition center of art works by many of the Spaniard artists who fled Spain during the Spanish Civil War of the 1930s. Among the artists whose work has been exposed there are Angel Botello, Carlos Marichal, Cristobal Ruiz and Francisco Vazquez. Coll who presided over the academy from 1941 to 1954, was also a professor of fine arts at the University of Puerto Rico. In 1982, she served as president of the Society of the Puerto Rican Author. According to the editorial of "Indice informativo de la novela hispanoamericana, Volume 5":

Dr. Edna Coll is known in the Latin American literary world for having consecrated more than twenty years to unravel the sense of fiction creation in Spanish-speaking America, and to organize this sense in synthesis and perspectives which surpass the nations where each one of these authors write.

=== Opera ===
Before the introduction of the cinema and television in Puerto Rico, there was opera. Opera was one of the main artistic menus in which Puerto Rican women have excelled. One of the earliest opera sopranos on the island was Amalia Paoli, the sister of Antonio Paoli. In the early 19th century, Paoli performed at the Teatro La Perla in the city of Ponce in Emilio Arrieta's opera "Marina". The first Puerto Rican to sing in a lead role at the New York Metropolitan Opera was Graciela Rivera. She played the role of "Lucia" in the December 1951 production of Lucia di Lammermoor.

The operatic soprano Martina Arroyo, an Afro-Puerto Rican had a major international opera career from the 1960s through the 1980s. She was part of the first generation of black opera singers of Puerto Rican descent to achieve wide success, and is viewed as part of an instrumental group of performers who helped break down the barriers of racial prejudice in the opera world. In 1976, she was appointed by President Gerald Ford to the National Council of the Arts in Washington, D.C. She founded the Martina Arroyo Foundation, which is dedicated to the development of emerging young opera singers by immersing them in complete role preparation courses. She is also active on the Boards of Trustees of Hunter College and Carnegie Hall. She was elected a Fellow of the American Academy of Arts and Sciences in 2000. On December 8, 2013, Arroyo received a Kennedy Center Honor.

Other women who have excelled as opera sopranos are:

- Ana María Martínez, On March 11, 2016, Martínez sang Bach/Gounod's "Ave Maria" and "Pie Jesu" from Fauré's Requiem during the funeral services of First Lady Nancy Reagan.;
- Melliangee Pérez, who was awarded the "Soprano of the Year" award by UNESCO,
- Irem Poventud, the first Puerto Rican to perform in the San Francisco Opera House;
- Margarita Castro Alberty, recipient of the Rockefeller Foundation, Baltimore Opera Guild, Chicago Opera Guide and Metropolitan Opera Guild awards. and
- Darysabel Isales Canas was a Puerto Rican opera singer and actress. She was a soprano. As a singer, Isales performed in the United States and in Austria.

=== Literary arts ===
There is a steep tradition of Puerto Rican women writers, especially lyrical poetry and fiction. Among the most celebrated Puerto Rican poets is Julia de Burgos whose work is credited with shaping modern Puerto Rican identity. Predating the Nuyorican poetry movement, de Burgos' poems engage themes of feminism, American imperialism, and social justice. Among the avant-garde Puerto Rican women is Giannina Braschi (1953) whose trilogy Empire of Dreams, Yo-Yo Boing! and United States of Banana collectively dramatize Puerto Rico's relationship with the United States. The mainstream Puerto Rican women novelists include Rosario Ferré (1938–2016) who wrote Eccentric Neighborhoods and Esmeralda Santiago (1948) who wrote When I Was Puerto Rican; both novelists explore how Puerto Rican women are perceived as "eccentric" or misplaced in mainstream American discourse. Other women storytellers on the island include Judith Ortiz Cofer (1956–2016), Mayra Santos-Febres (1966), and humorist Ana Lydia Vega (1946). Angelamaría Dávila (1944–2003) was an Afro-feminist and Afro-Caribbean voice who identified her black Puerto Ricanness as a defining characteristic of her work and personal identity.

== Women in popular culture ==
=== Television ===
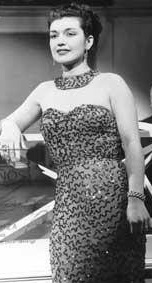
Elsa Miranda in 1950

Elsa Miranda (1922–2007), who was born in Ponce, moved to New York City with her mother Amelia Miranda (1898–2007) and became a vocalist during the Golden Age of Radio in the 1940s. Included among her most popular songs were Adiós Mariquita Linda as performed with Alfredo Antonini's Viva America Orchestra, Cariñoso as performed with Desi Arnaz and his orchestra, Besos de Fuergo and Sonata Fantasía among others. Miranda first appeared on the radio performing the promotional singing commercial Chiquita Banana in 1945. Her interpretation of the tropical tune proved to be immensely popular and was broadcast over 2,700 times per week.

As a result of this exposure, Miranda soon emerged in a series of performances on radio networks in New York City. By 1946, she appeared on such network broadcasts as The Jack Smith Show on CBS and Leave It To Mike on Mutual. At this time she also engaged in a series of collaborations with noted interpreters of Latin American music in New York including Xavier Cugat on the C-C Spotlight Bands show for WOR radio and Alfredo Antonini on the Viva America show for the Columbia Broadcasting System and Voice of America. While performing on Viva America she also collaborated with several international musicians of that era including: the Mexican tenors Juan Arvizu and Nestor Mesta Chayres, the Argentine composer/arranger Terig Tucci and members of the CBS Pan American Orchestra including John Serry Sr.

External audio
- You may listen to Elsa Miranda in the first "Chiquita Banana" commercial here

Puerto Rican women also played an important role as pioneers of Puerto Rico's television industry. Lucy Boscana founded the Puerto Rican Tablado Company, a traveling theater. Among the plays that she produced with the company was The Oxcart by fellow Puerto Rican playwright René Marqués. She presented the play in Puerto Rico and on Off-Broadway in New York City. On August 22, 1955, Boscana became a pioneer in the television of Puerto Rico when she participated in Puerto Rico's first telenovela (soap opera) titled Ante la Ley, alongside fellow television pioneer Esther Sandoval. The soap opera was broadcast in Puerto Rico by Telemundo. Among the other television pioneers were Awilda Carbia and Gladys Rodríguez.

In 1954, Puerto Rican television pioneer and producer Tommy Muñiz, offered Carmen Belén Richardson a role in his new program El Colegio de la Alegria. She played the part of "Lirio Blanco", a funny, extremely tall girl who could open her eyes in amazement extremely wide. Thus, Richardson became the first Afro-Puerto Rican actress in Puerto Rico's television industry. Sylvia del Villard was another actress, dancer and choreographer who became one of the first Afro-Puerto Rican activists. In New York she founded a theater group which she named Sininke. She made many presentations in the Museum of Natural History in that city. In 1981, Sylvia del Villard became the first and only director of the office of the Afro-Puerto Rican affairs of the Puerto Rican Institute of Culture. She was known to be an outspoken activist who fought for the equal rights of the Black Puerto Rican artist.

Ángela Meyer is the founder and/or co-founder of various entertainment production companies. Among the production companies that have been associated with Meyer are "Meca Productions", which produced theater and television productions and "Meyer de Jesus Productions", which produced soap operas. Meyer and her friend and fellow actress, Camille Carrión, founded Meca Productions with the idea of producing theater and television productions. Their first theater production was Casa de Mujeres (House of Women), which went on for 105 presentations. They also produced for Tele-Once the show Ellas al Mediodia and the soap operas La Isla (The Island), Ave de paso (Bird of passage) and Yara Prohibida (Forbidden Yara).

=== Cinema ===
External audio
- You may watch Marquita Rivera in "Luba Malina Cuban Pete" here

In the cinema industry Marquita Rivera was the first Puerto Rican actress to appear in a major Hollywood motion picture when she was cast in the 1947, film Road to Rio. Other women from Puerto Rico who have succeeded in the United States as actresses include Míriam Colón and Rita Moreno. Rosie Perez, whose parents were from Puerto Rico, has also had a successful career in the cinema industry.

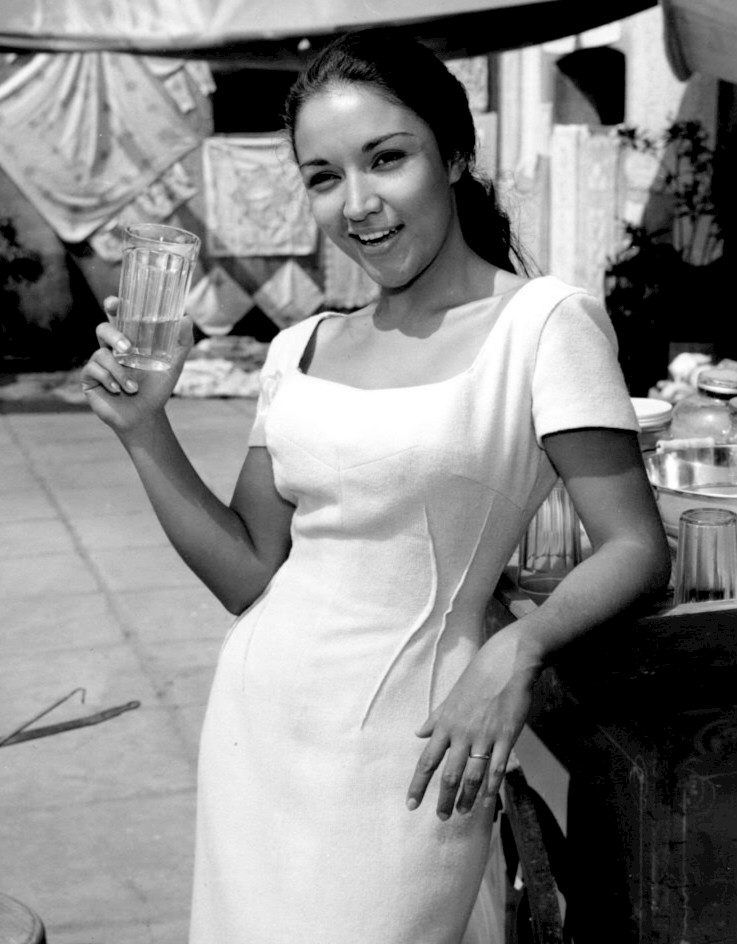
Miriam Colon

Miriam Colon is the founder of The Puerto Rican Traveling Theatre and recipient of an "Obie Award" for "Lifetime Achievement in the Theater". Colón debuted as an actress in Peloteros (Baseball Players), a film produced in Puerto Rico starring Ramón (Diplo) Rivero, in which she played the character Lolita.

Rita Moreno played the role of "Anita" in the 1961, adaptation of Leonard Bernstein's and Stephen Sondheim's groundbreaking Broadway musical West Side Story. She is the first Latin woman to win an Oscar, an Emmy, a Grammy and a Tony.

Rosie Perez, whose parents are from Aguadilla, Puerto Rico is an actress, community activist, talk show host, author, dancer, and choreographer. Her film breakthrough performance was her portrayal of Tina in Spike Lee's Do the Right Thing (1989), which she followed with White Men Can't Jump (1992). Among her many honors, she was nominated for the Academy Award for Best Supporting Actress for her performance in Fearless (1993) as well as three Emmy Awards for her work as a choreographer on In Living Color (1990–1994). Perez has also performed in stage plays on Broadway, such as The Ritz, Frankie and Johnny in the Clair de Lune, and Fish in the Dark. She was also a co-host on the ABC talk show The View during the series' 18th season. In 2020, she starred in the superhero film Birds of Prey, as comic book character Renee Montoya.

Puerto Rican women in the cinema industry have expanded their horizons beyond the field of acting. Such is the case of Ivonne Belén who is a documentary movie director and producer. Belén's first experience of doing a documentary film was in 1992 when she was the Co-Producer and Art Director of "Rafael Hernández, Jibarito del Mundo". She then worked on two other documentaries, "Adome, la presencia Africana en Puerto Rico" (Adome, the African presence in Puerto Rico) (1992) and "Reseña de una Vida Util" (Review of a Useful Life) (1995). The experience gained from these documentaries inspired her to form her own film company called The Paradiso Film Company, in which she is the executive producer. In 1996, she produced, directed and wrote the screenplay for the documentary she titled "A Passion named Clara Lair".

=== Music ===
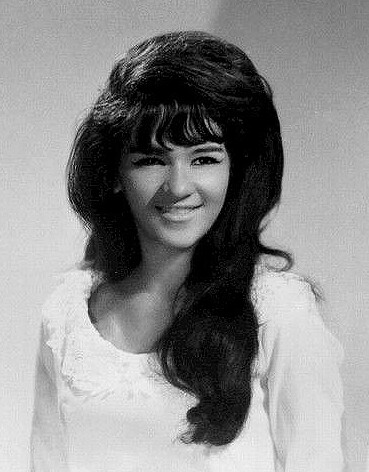
Nedra Talley

The decade of the 1950s witnessed a rise of composers and singers of typical Puerto Rican music and the Bolero genre. Women such as Ruth Fernández, Carmita Jiménez, Sylvia Rexach and Myrta Silva were instrumental in the exportation and internationalization of Puerto Rico's music. Among the women who have contributed to the island's contemporary popular music are Nydia Caro one of the first winners of the prestigious "Festival de Benidorm" in Valencia, Spain, with the song "Vete Ya", composed by Julio Iglesias, Lucecita Benítez winner of the Festival de la Cancion Latina (Festival of the Latin Song) in Mexico, Olga Tañón who has two Grammy Awards, three Latin Grammy Awards, and 28 Premios Lo Nuestro Awards and Martha Ivelisse Pesante Rodríguez known as "Ivy Queen".

Nedra Talley, who has Puerto Rican blood flowing in her veins (Puerto Rican father), is a founding member of "The Ronettes" a 1960s girl Rock n Roll group whose hits included "Be My Baby", "Baby, I Love You", "(The Best Part of) Breakin' Up", and "Walking in the Rain". She was inducted into the Rock and Roll Hall of Fame in 2007, together with the other two original members of the group.

Another example is Irene Cara, born to a Puerto Rican father. In 1980, Cara played the role of Coco Hernandez in the film Fame, and recorded the film's title song "Fame". She received Grammy nominations for "Best New Female Artist" and "Best New Pop Artist", as well as a Golden Globe nomination for "Best Motion Picture Actress in a Musical". Prior to her success with Fame Cara sang and co-wrote the song "Flashdance... What a Feeling" (from the film Flashdance), for which she won an Academy Award for Best Original Song and a Grammy Award for Best Female Pop Vocal Performance.

Jennifer Lopez a.k.a. "J-Lo" is an entertainer, businesswoman, philanthropist and producer who was born in New York. She is proud of her Puerto Rican heritage and is regarded by Time magazine as the most influential Hispanic performer in the United States and one of the 25 most influential Hispanics in America. As a philanthropist she launched a telemedicine center in San Juan, Puerto Rico, at the San Jorge Children's Hospital and has plans to launch a second one at the University Pediatric Hospital at the Centro Medico.

== Women's empowerment ==
In the 1950s and '60s, with the industrialization of Puerto Rico, women's jobs shifted from factory workers to that of professionals or office workers. Among the factors that influenced the role that women played in the industrial development of Puerto Rico was that the divorce rate was high and some women became the sole economic income source of their families. The feminist and women's rights movements have also contributed to the empowerment of women in the fields of business, the military, and politics. They have also held positions of great importance in NASA, as administrators and as scientists in the field of aerospace.

In the 1960s, Puerto Rican women led a radical movement in Harlem that was originally led by only the male members of the Young Lords Party. Despite being one of the founding members of the party, Denise Oliver was furious that there was little to no female representation within the organization. The male members of the Young Lords wanted to create a revolutionary machismo movement and leave the women out. Oliver, along with four other women, pushed their way to leadership positions and forced their male members to take classes on sexism and to learn about the damage that their actions caused the community. They changed the ideas of the revolutionization of machismo and instead began to push for more equality between the genders into the organization. They still had more to fight for, however, the problems with healthcare were affecting Puerto Rican women at an all-time high because of sterilization. One of the first legal abortions in the United States killed a Puerto Rican woman because doctors failed to account for her heart defect when they performed the procedure. This is what the Young Lords Party eventually began to fight for. However, they never gained enough momentum because of their issues with balancing which causes deserved a certain amount of attention. "La Mujer en La Lucha Hoy" was an anthology published by Nancy A. Zayas and Juan Angel Silen that collected the stories told by women which allowed to give some insight into the beginning of feminism in Puerto Rico in the 1970s.

=== Business ===
Among those who have triumphed as businesswoman are Carmen Ana Culpeper who served as the first female Secretary of the Puerto Rico Department of the Treasury during the administration of Governor Carlos Romero Barceló and later served as the president of the then government-owned Puerto Rico Telephone Company during the governorship of Pedro Rosselló,; Victoria Hernández who in 1927, established a music store called "Almacenes Hernández" in New York City thus, becoming the first female Puerto Rican to own a music store in that city; Camalia Valdés the president and CEO of Cerveceria India, Inc., Puerto Rico's largest brewery.; and Carlota Alfaro, a high fashion designer known as "Puerto Rico's grande dame of fashion".

Deirdre Connelly, a native of San Juan, served as president of North America Pharmaceuticals for GlaxoSmithKline from 2009 to 2015. Connolly was recognized for nine consecutive years (2006–2014) by Fortune magazine as one of the 50 most powerful women in business. In April 2010, she was named Woman of the Year by the Healthcare Businesswomen's Association. Connelly also serves as a member of the board of directors for Macy's, Inc. and Genmab A/S. In 2008, she was appointed to President Obama's Commission on White House Fellowships, where she helped in the selection of the White House Fellows, a prestigious annual program that fosters leadership and public service.

=== Military leadership ===
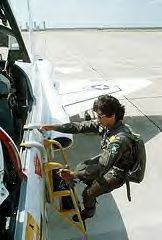
Lieutenant Colonel Custodio climbing down from the cockpit of a T-38

Changes within the policy and military structure of the U.S. armed forces helped expand the participation and roles for women in the military, among these the establishment of the All-Volunteer Force in the 1970s. Puerto Rican women and women of Puerto Rican descent have continued to join the Armed Forces, and some have even made the military a career. Among the Puerto Rican women who have or had high ranking positions are the following:

Lieutenant Colonel Olga E. Custodio (USAF) became the first Hispanic female U.S. military pilot. She holds the distinction of being the first Latina to complete U.S. Air Force military pilot training. Upon retiring from the military, she is also the first Latina commercial airline captain. In 2017, Custodio was inducted into the San Antonio Aviation and Aerospace Hall of Fame for being the first Hispanic Female Military pilot in the United States Air Force.

Major Sonia Roca was the first Hispanic female officer to attend the Command and General Staff Officer Course at the Army's School of the Americas. In 2007, United States Air Force Captain Hila Levy became the first Puerto Rican to be awarded a Rhodes Scholarship. She was honored with a plaque that has her name, squadron name and graduation date, which was placed in the ballroom balcony of the United States Air Force Academy's hall of honor. The plaque recognizes Levy as the top former CAP cadet in the Class of 2008.

Colonel Maritza Sáenz Ryan (U.S. Army), is the head of the Department of Law at the United States Military Academy. She is the first female and the first Hispanic West Point graduate to serve as an academic department head. She also has the distinction of being the most senior-ranking Hispanic Judge Advocate. As of June 15, 2011, Colonel Maria Zumwalt (U. S. Army) served as commander of the 48th Chemical Brigade. Captain Haydee Javier Kimmich (U.S. Navy) from Cabo Rojo, Puerto Rico was the highest-ranking Hispanic female in the Navy. Kimmich was assigned as the Chief of Orthopedics at the Navy Medical Center in Bethesda. She reorganized their Reservist Department during Operation Desert Storm. In 1998, she was selected as the woman of the year in Puerto Rico.

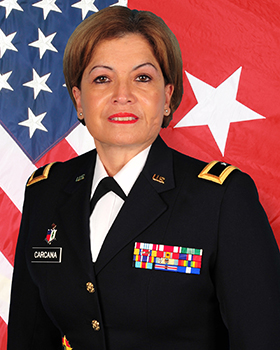
Brigadier General Marta Carcana

In July 2015, Puerto Rico Governor Alejandro Garcia Padilla nominated Colonel Marta Carcana for the position of Adjutant General of the Puerto Rican National Guard, a position that she unofficially held since 2014. On September 4, 2015, she was confirmed as the first Puerto Rican woman to lead the Puerto Rican National Guard and promoted to Major General.

Irene M. Zoppi also known as "RAMBA", was deployed to Kuwait, Iraq, and Saudi Arabia with the 3rd Armored Division as a Military Intelligence Officer. She was one of few Latino women, who served during Desert Shield/Storm War in a Tank Division. In 2018, Zoppi became the first Puerto Rican woman to reach the rank of Brigadier General in the United States Army. She is currently the Deputy Commanding General – Support under the 200th Military Police Command at Fort Meade, Maryland. Zoppi is a Bronze Star Medal recipient.

==== Ultimate sacrifice ====
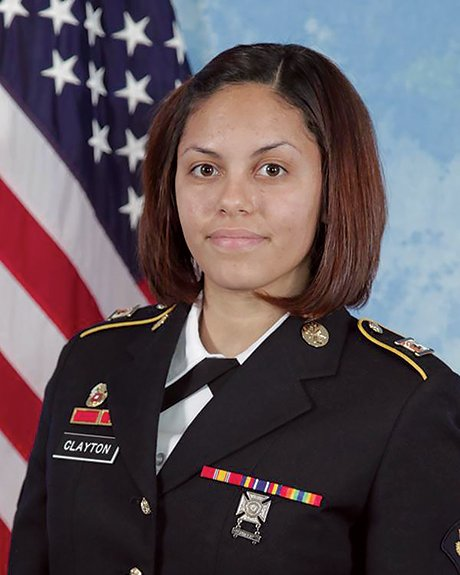
Spc. Hilda I. Ortiz Clayton

Puerto Rican servicewomen were among the 41,000 women who participated in Operation Desert Shield and Operation Desert Storm. They also served in the battlefields of Afghanistan and Iraq where the first four Puerto Rican women perished in combat. The Puerto Rican women who made the ultimate sacrifice in combat are the following:

- SPC Frances M. Vega, the first female soldier of Puerto Rican descent to die in a combat zone
- SPC Aleina Ramirez Gonzalez died in Tikrit, Iraq, when a mortar struck her forward operating base.
- SPC Lizbeth Robles, was the first female soldier born in Puerto Rico to die in the war on terrorism
- Captain Maria Ines Ortiz, was the first Hispanic nurse to die in combat and first Army nurse to die in combat since the Viet Nam War.

The names of the four women are engraved in El Monumento de la Recordación (The Monument of Remembrance), which is dedicated to Puerto Rico's fallen soldiers and situated in front of the Capitol Building in San Juan, Puerto Rico.

The first female soldier of Puerto Rican descent to die of a non-combat related accident was Spec. Hilda I. Ortiz Clayton. Ortiz Clayton was an Army combat photographer who was killed in 2013 when a mortar exploded during an Afghan training exercise. She captured the explosion that killed her and four Afghan soldiers on a photo which she took. Ortiz Clayton was the first combat documentation and production specialist to be killed in Afghanistan. She was assigned to the 55th Signal Company (Combat Camera) 21st Signal Brigade, Fort Meade, Maryland.The 55th Signal Company named their annual competitive award for combat camera work "The Spc. Hilda I. Clayton Best Combat Camera (COMCAM) Competition" in her honor

=== Politics ===
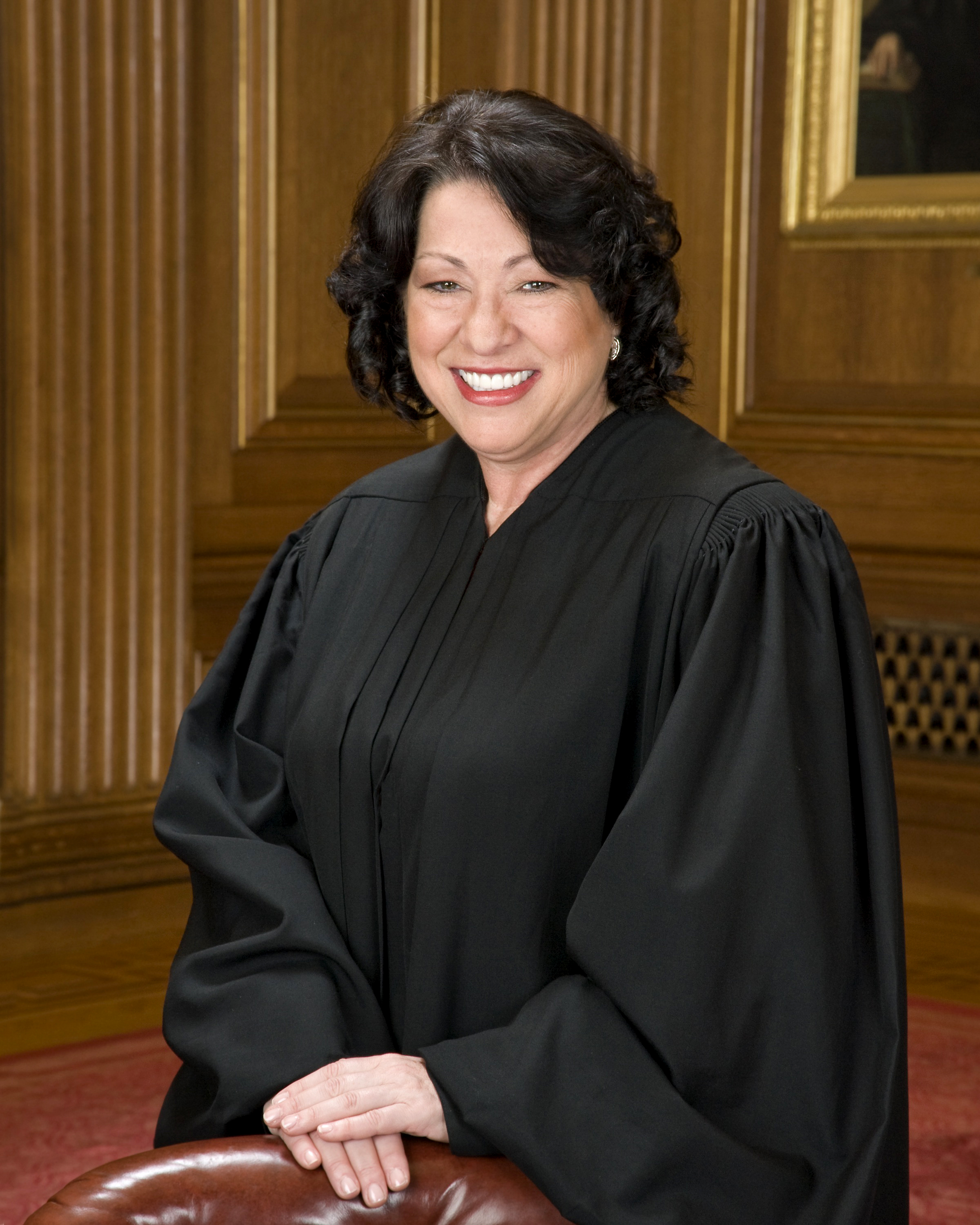
Sonia Sotomayor, the first Latina Supreme Court Justice

Among the notable women involved in politics in Puerto Rico are María de Pérez Almiroty, who began her career as an educator and in 1936, became the first woman to be elected senator in Puerto Rico. In 1938, she served as Acting leader of the Liberal Party upon the death of the party president Antonio Rafael Barceló. That same year Josefina Barceló Bird de Romero, the daughter of Antonio Rafael Barceló, became the first Puerto Rican woman to preside a political party in the island when she was named president of the Liberal Party.

Felisa Rincón de Gautier, also known as Doña Fela, was elected mayor of San Juan in 1946, becoming the first woman to have been elected mayor of a capital city in the Americas. María Luisa Arcelay was the first woman in Puerto Rico and in all of Latin America to be elected to a government legislative body. and Sila M. Calderón, former mayor of San Juan, became in November 2000, the first woman governor of Puerto Rico. In August 2019, Governor Ricardo Rosselló resigned and Wanda Vázquez Garced was sworn in as the 13th governor of Puerto Rico. On November 8, 2016, former Speaker of the House Jenniffer Gonzalez became the first woman and youngest person to be elected Resident Commissioner of Puerto Rico in the U.S. Congress in the 115 years since the seat had been created.

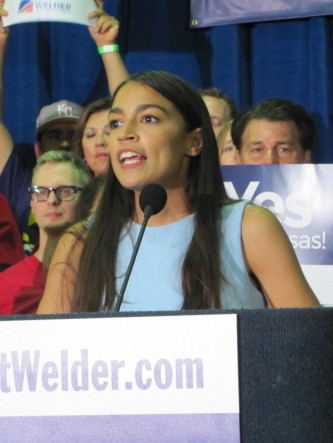
Alexandria Ocasio-Cortez

Their empowerment was not only limited to Puerto Rico. They also became participants in the political arena of the United States. Olga A. Méndez was the first Puerto Rican woman elected to a state legislature in the United States mainland, when, in 1978, she became a member of the New York State Senate. In 1993, Nydia Velázquez became the first Puerto Rican Congresswoman and Chair of House Small Business Committee in the United States and in 1994, Carmen E. Arroyo became the first Hispanic woman elected to the New York State Assembly. She is also the first Puerto Rican woman to serve as housing developer in the State of New York. Arroyo's 84th Assembly District covers the Mott Haven, Port Morris, Melrose, The Hub, Longwood, Concourse, and Hunts Point sections of the South Bronx. In November 2018, Alexandria Ocasio-Cortez, who represents parts of The Bronx and Queens, became the youngest woman ever to be elected to Congress.

In May 2009, President Barack Obama nominated Sonia Sotomayor to the Supreme Court following the retirement of Justice David Souter. Her nomination was confirmed by the Senate in August 2009 by a vote of 68–31. Sotomayor has supported, while on the court, the informal liberal bloc of justices when they divide along the commonly perceived ideological lines. During her tenure on the Supreme Court, Sotomayor has been identified with concern for the rights of defendants, calls for reform of the criminal justice system, and making impassioned dissents on issues of race, gender and ethnic identity.

=== Aerospace ===
With the advances in medical technologies and the coming of the Space Age of the 20th century, Puerto Rican women have expanded their horizons and have made many contributions in various scientific fields, among them the fields of aerospace and medicine.

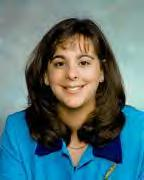
Monserrate Román

Puerto Rican women, have reached top positions in NASA, serving in sensitive leadership positions. Nitza Margarita Cintron was named chief of NASA's Johnson Space Center Space Medicine and Health Care Systems Office in 2004. Other women involved in the United States Space Program are Mercedes Reaves, the research engineer and scientist responsible for the design of a viable full-scale solar sail and the development and testing of a scale model solar sail at NASA Langley Research Center and Monserrate Román, a microbiologist who participated in building the International Space Station.

In 2006, Genoveva Negrón, a native of Mayaquez, was a member of the 53rd crew of the Spaceward Bound program at the Mars Desert Research Station in Utah. The program was designed to train astronauts to travel to the Moon between 2018 and 2020. The program also serves to train astronauts for the exploration of the planet Mars in future missions. She had to spend two weeks (15 days) in an environment in Utah that NASA scientists believe to be similar to that of Mars and work up to 15 hours a day. Negron is also an educator and author who in 2015, began to conduct research on digital simulation with virtual reality.

Yajaira Sierra Sastre was chosen in 2013, to participate in a new NASA project called "HI-SEAS" an acronym for "Hawaii Space Exploration Analog and Simulation", that will help to determine why astronauts don't eat enough, having noted that they get bored with spaceship food and end up with problems like weight loss and lethargy that put their health at risk. She lived for four months (March–August 2013) isolated in a planetary module to simulate what life will be like for astronauts at a future base on Mars at a base in Hawaii. Sierra Sastre hopes to become the first Puerto Rican female astronaut to be sent to outer space.,

The lead electrical engineer for the Space Experiment Module program at the Wallops Flight Facility located in Virginia, which is part of NASA's Goddard Flight Facility, is Lissette Martínez an Electrical Engineer and Rocket Scientist. She is responsible for providing electrical engineering support to Code 870 Space Experiment Module (SEM) program. She is also responsible for the testing of ground and flight hardware. Martinez works with students around the world, helping them with science experiments that will actually ride along on Space Shuttle missions and blast into space. Martinez was a member of the team that launched a rocket from White Sands, New Mexico to gather information on the Hale-Bopp Comet in 1999. She was featured in the November 2002 issue of Latina magazine.

=== Medicine ===
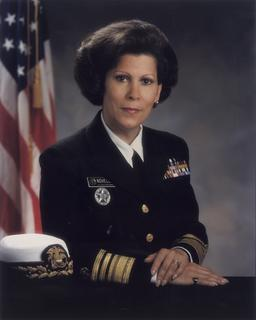
Antonia Novello

Antonia Coello Novello is a pediatrician who served as the 14th Surgeon General of the United States from 1990 to 1993.

In 1978, Novello joined and received a commission in the Public Health Service Commissioned Corps (PHSCC) rising all the way up to flag officer/medical director grade. Her first assignment being as a project officer at the National Institute of Arthritis, Metabolism and Digestive Diseases of the National Institutes of Health (NIH). She held various positions at NIH, rising to the medical director/flag rank in the PHSCC and to the job of deputy director of the National Institute of Child Health and Human Development (NICHD) in 1986. She also served as Coordinator for AIDS Research for NICHD from September 1987. In this role, she developed a particular interest in pediatric AIDS. Novello made major contributions to the drafting and enactment of the Organ Transplantation Procurement Act of 1984 while assigned to the United States Senate Committee on Labor and Human Resources, working with the staff of committee chairman Orrin Hatch. She was the first woman and the first Hispanic (Puerto Rican) to hold the position of Surgeon General.

Milagros (Mili) J. Cordero is a licensed, registered occupational therapist with board certification in Pediatrics. She is the founder and President of ITT'S for Children, a professional group that assists and empowers parents to develop a better understanding of the strengths and needs of their children and to enhance their children's development to the full extent of their capability. Cordero is certified in the use of SAMONAS and Tomatis sound therapies. She is a member of the national DIR Institute faculty and serves as vice-chair to Georgia 's State Interagency Coordinating Council for the Babies Can't Wait Program, the professional advisory council of the National Cornelia De Lange Association, and the board of the Frazer Center in Atlanta, Georgia.

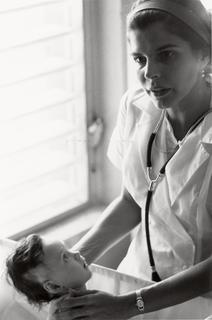
Helen Rodriguez-Trias

Helen Rodríguez-Trías was a Pediatrician and activist. She was the first Latina president of The American Public Health Association, a founding member of the Women's Caucus of the American Public Health Association and the recipient of the Presidential Citizen's Medal. She testified before the Department of Health, Education, and Welfare for passage of federal sterilization guidelines. The guidelines, which she drafted, require a woman's written consent to sterilization, offered in a language they can understand, and set a waiting period between the consent and the sterilization procedure. She is credited with helping to expand the range of public health services for women and children in minority and low-income populations in the United States, Central and South America, Africa, Asia, and the Middle East

Puerto Rican women have also excelled in the fields of Physics and Physiology. Among them Mayda Velasco and María Cordero Hardy.

Physics is the study of the laws and constituents of the material world and encompasses a wide variety of fields, including condensed matter physics, biological physics, astrophysics, particle physics, and others. Mayda Velasco is a professor of physics at Northwestern University. Her research is centered in particle physics. She plays a leadership role in the CMS experiment at the CERN LHC. She is currently the director of the "Colegio de Física Fundamental e Interdiciplinaria de las Ámericas" (College of Fundamental and Interdisciplinary Physics of the Americas) located in San Juan, Puerto Rico.

María Cordero Hardy, is a physiologist. Physiology is the study of life, specifically, how cells, tissues, and organisms function. She is a scientist who did her research on vitamin E. Her work helped other scientists understand about how vitamin E works in the human body. She is now a professor at Louisiana State University and teaches students how to be medical technologists. A medical technologist is a person who studies your blood and other body fluids in the human body.

== Puerto Rican women in other fields ==
Not only have Puerto Rican women excelled in many fields, such as business, politics, and science, they have also represented their country in other international venues such as beauty contests and sports. Some have been honored by the United States government for their contributions to society. Some of these contributions are described in the following paragraphs.

=== Beauty pageants and modeling ===
Five Puerto Rican women have won the title of Miss Universe and two the title of Miss World.

Miss Universe is an annual international beauty contest that is run by the Miss Universe Organization. Along with the Miss Earth and Miss World contests, Miss Universe is one of the three largest beauty pageants in the world in terms of the number of national-level competitions to participate in the world finals In 1970, Marisol Malaret Contreras (1949 – 2023) became the first Puerto Rican woman to be crowned "Miss Universe". She was followed by Deborah Carthy-Deu(1985), Dayanara Torres (1993), Denise Quiñones (2001) and Zuleyka Rivera (2006).

Madison Anderson Berrios won the Miss Universe Puerto Rico title in 2019. After a couple of months on the 8th of December 2019, she won the spot of the first runner-up of Miss Universe 2019.In 2023, she participated as a contestant representing Puerto Rico in a reality show called "La CASA De Los Famosos" (The house of the famous) aired by Telemundo and won the grand prize of 200 thousand dollars.

Miss World, created in the United Kingdom in 1951, is the oldest surviving major international Beauty pageant. Alongside with its rival, the Miss Universe and Miss Earth contests, Miss World pageant is one of the three most publicised beauty contests in the world. Wilnelia Merced became the first Puerto Rican Miss World in 1975. On December 18, 2016, Stephanie Del Valle became the second Puerto Rican to be crowned Miss World.

Modeling, Sofía Jirau made history in February 2022, by becoming the first model for Victoria's Secret with Down syndrome, after joining 17 other women in launching the brand's new campaign. The 24 year old model also launched a campaign of her own called "No Limits" in Spanish. The aim of her campaign is to show that people with Down syndrome have the capacity to achieve their personal goal regardless of their medical condition.

=== Historians ===
Historians, such as Delma S. Arrigoitia, have written books and documented the contributions that Puerto Rican women have made to society. Arrigoitia was the first person in the University of Puerto Rico to earn a master's degree in the field of history. In 2012, she published her book "Introduccion a la Historia de la Moda en Puerto Rico". The book, which was requested by the Puerto Rican high fashion designer Carlota Alfaro, covers over 500 years of history of the fashion industry in Puerto Rico. Arrigoitia is working on a book about the women who have served in the Puerto Rican Legislature, as requested by the former president of the Chamber of Representatives, Jenniffer González. Her work is not only limited to the contributions that Puerto Rican women have made to society, she authored books that cover the life and works of some of Puerto Rico's most prominent politicians of the early 20th century.

Another author, Teresita A. Levy, has researched and written a book about the tobacco industry in Puerto Rico that covers the era of 1898 to 1940. In her book "Puerto Ricans in the Empire" Levy describes how small-scale, politically involved, independent landowners grew most of the tobacco in Puerto Rico during the military and civilian occupation of the island. Levy is also an associate professor in the "Latin American and Puerto Rican Studies" faculty of Lehman College. She teaches History of Puerto Rico, History of Latin America and the Caribbean I and II, and History of the Dominican Republic.

=== Inventors ===
Olga D. González-Sanabria, a member of the Ohio Women's Hall of Fame, contributed to the development of the "Long Cycle-Life Nickel-Hydrogen Batteries", which helps enable the International Space Station power system.

Ileana Sánchez, a graphic designer, invented a book for the blind that brings together art and braille. Ms. Sanchez used a new technique called TechnoPrint and TechnoBraille. Rather than punch through heavy paper to create the raised dots of the Braille alphabet for the blind, these techniques apply an epoxy to the page to create not only raised dots, but raised images with texture. The epoxy melds with the page, becoming part of it, so that you can't scrape it off with your fingernail. The images are raised so that a blind person can feel the artwork and in color, not just to attract the sighted family who will read the book with blind siblings or children, but also for the blind themselves. The book "Art & the Alphabet, A Tactile Experience" is co-written with Rebecca McGinnis of the Metropolitan Museum of Art. The Met has already incorporated the book into their Access program.

Maria Aponte, of Añasco, Puerto Rico, together with fellow Puerto Ricans Guanglou Cheng and Carlos A. Ramirez, developed biodegradable polymers. A polymer is a large molecule (macromolecule) composed of repeating structural units connected by covalent chemical bonds. Well-known examples of polymers include plastics, DNA and proteins. According to the abstract released by the U.S. Patent & Trademark Office: "Degradable polyimides are prepared in high yield by polymerizing a monomer containing at least two anhydride groups, and a monomer containing at least two primary amine groups and at least one acidic group, in bulk or in a solvent. The polymides are very strong in terms of their mechanical properties, yet degradable under standard physiological conditions." The inventors were issued U.S. Patent No. 7,427,654.

=== Journalists ===
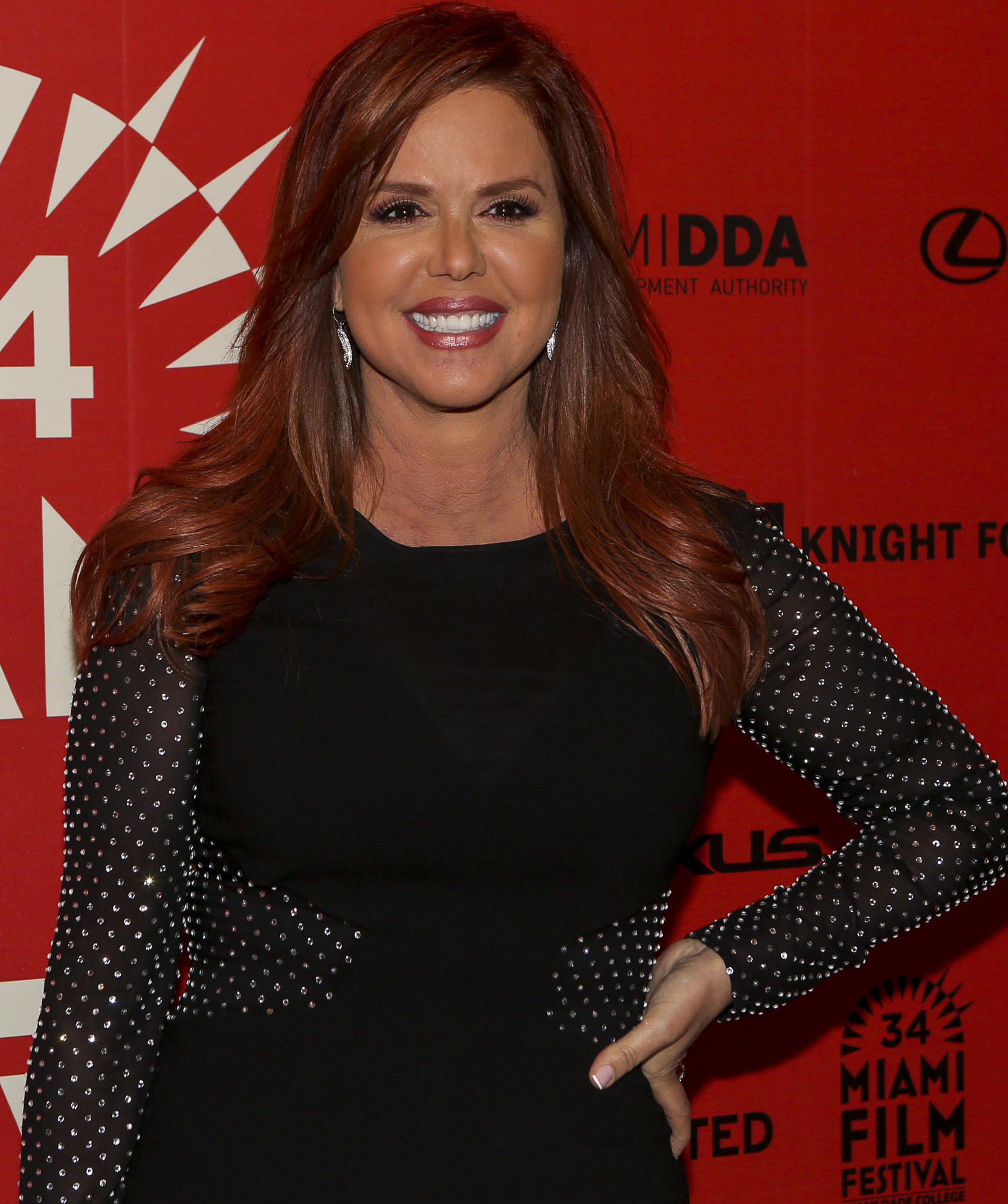
María Celeste Arrarás

Various Puerto Rican women have excelled in the field of journalism in Puerto Rico and in the United States, among them

Carmen Jovet, the first Puerto Rican woman to become a news anchor in Puerto Rico, Bárbara Bermudo, co-host of Primer Impacto, Elizabeth Vargas, anchor of ABC's television newsmagazine 20/20. She was previously an anchor of World News Tonight and María Celeste Arrarás, anchorwoman for Al Rojo Vivo.

=== Religion ===
Among the Puerto Rican women who became notable religious leaders in Puerto Rico are Juanita Garcia Peraza, a.k.a. "Mita", Sor Isolina Ferré Aguayo, Edna "Nedi" Rivera and Reverend Nilda Ernestina Lucca Oliveras.

Juanita Garcia Peraza, better known as Mita, founded the Mita Congregation, the only non-Catholic denomination religion of Puerto Rican origin. Under Perazas' leadership, the church founded many small businesses that provided work, orientation, and help for its members. The church has expanded to Mexico, Colombia, Venezuela, Dominican Republic, Costa Rica, Panama, El Salvador, Canada, Curaçao, Ecuador and Spain.

Sor Isolina Ferré Aguayo, a Roman Catholic nun, was the founder of the Centros Sor Isolina Ferré in Puerto Rico. The center revolved around a concept designed by Ferré originally known as "Advocacy Puerto Rican Style". The center worked with juvenile delinquents, by suggesting that they should be placed under custody by their community and that they should be treated with respect instead of as criminals. This method gathered interest from community leaders in the United States, who were interested in establishing similar programs. Her work was recognized by President Bill Clinton who in 1999, awarded her the Presidential Medal of Freedom at a ceremony in the White House

Bavi Edna "Nedi" Rivera is a bishop of the Episcopal Church who has held appointments in the Diocese of Olympia and the Diocese of Eastern Oregon. She is the first Hispanic woman to become a bishop in the Episcopal Church.

On August 15, 1982, Reverend Nilda Ernestina Lucca Oliveras became the first Puerto Rican woman to be ordained as a priest in the Episcopal Church of Puerto Rico, and the first in Latin America.

=== Sports ===
Among the women who have represented Puerto Rico in international sports competitions is Rebekah Colberg, known as "The Mother of Puerto Rican Women's Sports". Colberg participated in various athletic competitions in the 1938 Central American and Caribbean Games where she won the gold medals in discus and javelin throw.

In the Central American Games of 1959 in Caracas, the Puerto Rican female participation was limited to two tennis players and six in swimming, in what marked Puerto Rico's female team debut. The Puerto Rican tennis player Cindy Colbert won two silver medals, as she came in second in the doubles for ladies with Grace Valdés and she also participated in a mixedtennis partnership with Carlos Pasarell. In the games of 1962, the women who represented Puerto Rico won three gold medals, six silver and two bronze. The swimming team won two third places, as well as two first places and another four in second places. The gold medals were won by Julia Milotz (she also won three silver medals) and Vivian Carrión. Cindy Colbert won gold and silver in tennis doubles. Marta Torrós won bronze in singles. Cindy Colbert, Grace Valdéz and Martita Torros were inducted into the "Pabellón de La Fama Del Deporte Puertorriqueño" (The Puerto Rican Sports Pavilion of Fame).

Angelita Lind, a track and field athlete, participated in three Central American and Caribbean Games (CAC) and won two gold medals, three silver medals, and one bronze medal. She also participated in three Pan American Games and in the 1984 Olympics. Anita Lallande, a former Olympic swimmer, holds the island record for most medals won at CAC Games with a total of 17 medals, 10 of them being gold medals.

Isabel Bustamante is a Puerto Rican paralympic athlete. At the 1988 Summer Paralympics, she became the first Puerto Rican athlete to win a gold medal at an Olympic or Paralympic Games competition while competing for Puerto Rico. Bustamante won the gold medal at the Women's shot put 1B competition. She also won two silver medals at the same games, at the Women's discus throw 1B and the Women's javelin throw 1B competitions.

Women inducted into the
"Pabellón de La Fama Del Deporte Puertorriqueño"
(The Puerto Rican Sports Pavilion of Fame)

Name	Year inducted	Sport
Rebekah Colberg	1952	Athletics
Ciqui Faberllé	1955	Athletics
Sara Correa	1989	Athletics
Marie Lande Mathieu	1992	Athletics
Diana Rodríguez	1996	Athletics
Angelita Lind	2000	Athletics
Naydi Nazario	2000	Athletics
Vilma París	2011	Athletics
Aida L. "Ashie" González	2008	Bowling
María del Pilar Cerra	1952	Fencing
Gloria Colón	1995	Fencing
Nilmarie Santini	2000	Judo
Lisa Boscarino	2005	Judo
Carmina Méndez	1994	Fishing
Anita Lallande	1976	Swimming
Margaret Harding	1991	Swimming
Cristina Moir	1992	Swimming
Nilsa Lisa De Jesús	1994	Swimming
Rita Garay	2003	Swimming
Sonia Álvarez Fonseca	2010	Swimming
Donna Terry	1992	Softball
Carmen Aguayo	1995	Softball
Wanda Maldonado	2001	Softball
Idel Vázquez	2001	Softball
Ivelisse Echevarría	2003	Softball
Betty Segarra	2004	Softball
Clara Vázquez	2005	Softball
Lissette "Kiki" Gaetan	2009	Table Tennis
Grace Valdéz	1968	Tennis
Mady Romeu	1975	Tennis
Martita Torros	1984	Tennis
Josefina Cabrera	1985	Tennis
Cindy Colbert	1990	Tennis
Crissy González	1994	Tennis
Marilda Julia	2000	Tennis
Beatríz (Gigi) Fernández	2007	Tennis
Emilie Viqueira	2011	Tennis
Flor Zengotita	1979	Volleyball
Iris Toro	1985	Volleyball
Carole Díaz	1986	Volleyball
Bessie Figueroa	1994	Volleyball
Betty García	1973	Sports Promoter
Rosarito López Cepero	1998	Sports Promoter

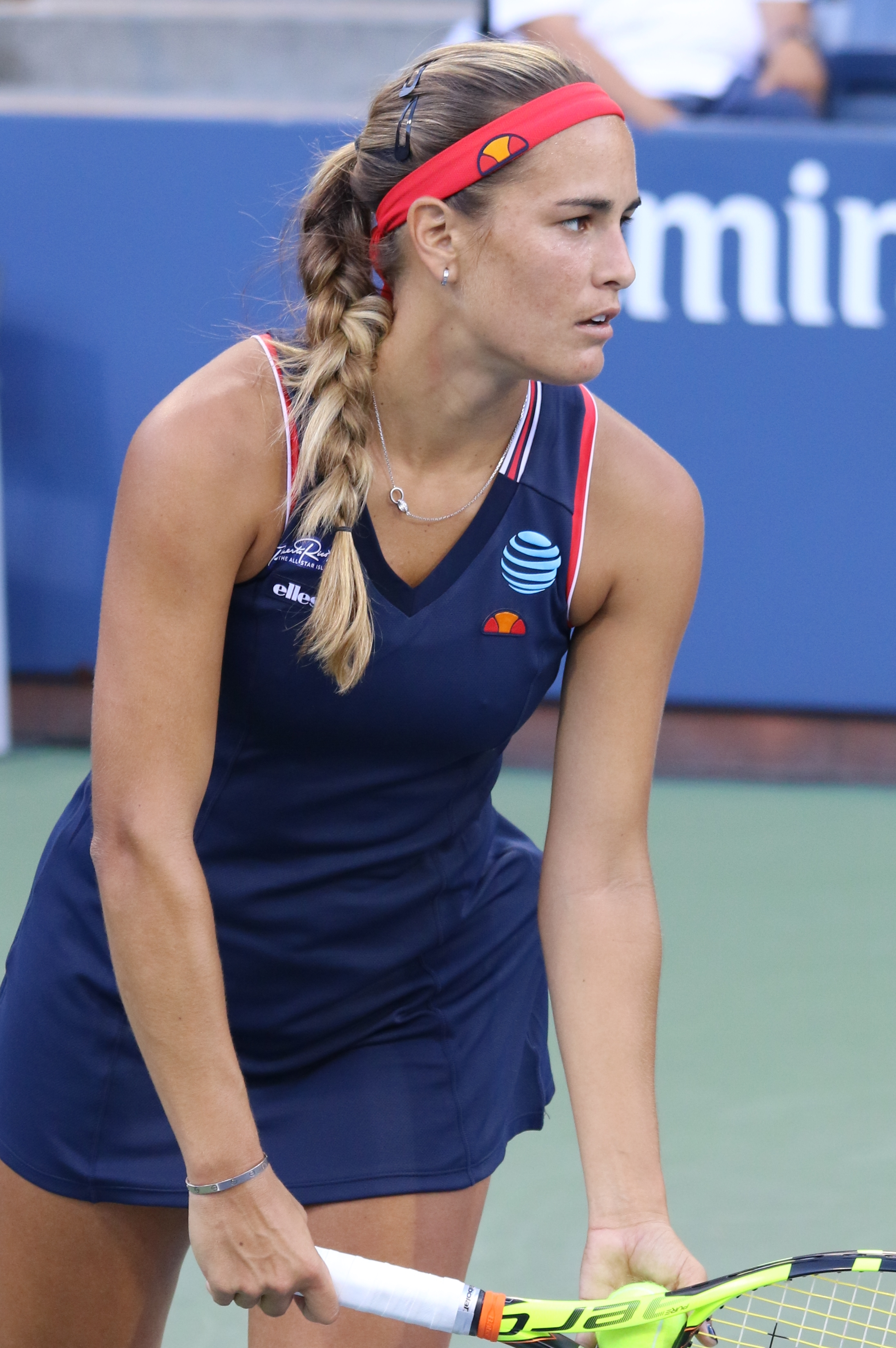
Monica Puig won the first Olympic gold medal for Puerto Rico

Laura Daniela Lloreda is a Puerto Rican who represented Mexico at various international women's volleyball competitions and played professional volleyball both in Mexico and in Puerto Rico, and Ada Vélez is a Puerto Rican former boxer who became the country's first professional women's world boxing champion.

In 1999, Carla Malatrasi and her husband Enrique Figueroa won a gold medal in sailing in the Pan Am Hobie competition celebrated in Winnipeg, Canada. In 2002, Carla and her husband came in 3rd place in the Hobie Racing-ISAF Sailing Games H-16 which took place in Marseille, France, in which they went against 36 teams representing 20 nations. On March 3, 2003, the Senate of Puerto Rico honored Carla Malatrasi and her husband Enrique, by recognizing their achievements

Puerto Rico has participated in the Olympics, since the 1948 Summer Olympics, which were celebrated in London, as an independent nation. However, since Puerto Ricans have American citizenship, Puerto Rican athletes have the option of representing Puerto Rico or moving to the United States where after living there for 3 years or more they can represent that country in the games. Some Puerto Ricans, such as Gigi Fernández in tennis, have won gold medals for the U.S. Also, women who are of Puerto Rican heritage are considered by the Government of Puerto Rico to be "Puerto Rican Citizens". Since 2007, the Government of Puerto Rico has been issuing "Certificates of Puerto Rican Citizenship" to anyone born in Puerto Rico or to anyone born outside of Puerto Rico with at least one parent who was born in Puerto Rico.

Kristina Brandi represented Puerto Rico in the 2004 Summer Olympics in Athens, Greece. She became the first tennis player representing Puerto Rico to win a singles match in an Olympic event when she beat Jelena Kostanić from Croatia (7–5 and 6–1). She lost in the second round to Russian Anastasia Myskina.

At the 2016 Summer Olympics in Rio de Janeiro, Monica Puig made Olympic history when she became the first person to win an Olympic gold medal for Puerto Rico by defeating Germany's Angelique Kerber in the women's singles tennis final. She became the first Puerto Rican female medalist in any sport. On August 2, 2021, Jasmine Camacho-Quinn won Puerto Rico's second Olympic gold medal in the Women's 100m Hurdles in the Olympic games which were celebrated in Tokyo, Japan.

The following table has a list of the Puerto Rican women, including women of Puerto Rican ancestry, who won Olympic medals.

Puerto Rican Women Olympic Medallists

Number	Name	Medal/s	Sport	Year and place	Country represented
1	Gigi Fernández	Gold (2)	Women's Doubles Tennis	1992 Barcelona, Spain; 1996 Atlanta, United States	United States
2	Lisa Fernandez	Gold (3)	Softball	1996 Atlanta, United States; 2000 Sydney, Australia; 2004 Athens, Greece	United States
3	Julie Chu	Silver (3), Bronze	Women's Ice Hockey	2002 Salt Lake City, United States; 2006 Turin, Italy; 2010 Vancouver, Canada; 2014 Sochi, Russia	United States
4	Maritza Correia	Silver	Swimming 4 × 100 m Freestyle	2004 Athens, Greece	United States
5	Kyla Ross	Gold	400m Women's Gymnastics	2012 London, United Kingdom	United States
6	Jessica Steffens	Silver, Gold	Water Polo	2008 Beijing, China; 2012 London, United Kingdom	United States
7	Maggie Steffens	Gold (2)	Water Polo	2012 London, United Kingdom; 2016 Rio de Janeiro, Brazil	United States
8	Laurie Hernandez	Gold, Silver	Women's Gymnastics (G); Balance Beam (S)	2016 Rio de Janeiro, Brazil	United States
9	Monica Puig	Gold	Women's Singles Tennis	2016 Rio de Janeiro, Brazil	Puerto Rico
10	Jasmine Camacho-Quinn	Gold	Women's 100m Hurdles	2021 Tokyo, Japan	Puerto Rico

Total Olympic medals

Total of medals for Puerto Rico	Gold	Silver	Bronze
2	2	0	0
Total of medals for the United States	Gold	Silver	Bronze
17	10	6	1
Total of medals	Gold	Silver	Bronze
19	12	6	1

== Aftermath of Hurricane Maria ==
After Hurricane Maria in 2017, many Puerto Rican women were the driving force to starting up the rebuilding of the island. According to a 2018 Vogue article, they "waded into flooded neighbourhoods to extricate the abandoned, and put together soup kitchens to feed the hungry. They've canvassed their communities in order to diagnose the most critical needs – street by street, mountain by mountain, house by house, family by family – and have returned when they said they would with supplies and support." Small, female-led organizations were creating fundraisers and went out on foot to retrieve supplies for affected families.

== Governmental recognition ==
=== Women's week in Puerto Rico ===
On June 2, 1976, the Legislative Assembly of Puerto Rico approved law number 102 that declared every March 2 "Día Internacional de la Mujer" (International Women's Day) as a tribute to the Puerto Rican women. However, the government of Puerto Rico decided that it would only be proper that a week instead of a day be dedicated in tribute to the accomplishments and contributions of the Puerto Rican women. Therefore, on September 16, 2004, the Legislative Assembly of Puerto Rico passed law number 327, which declares the second week of the month of March the "Semana de la Mujer en Puerto Rico" (Women's week in Puerto Rico).

In 2002, the Monumento a la Mujer (Monument to Women), a statue commemorating the contributions of the Puerto Rican women to the Puerto Rican society was unveiled at the fork of Calle Marina and Calle Mayor Cantera, in Ponce, Puerto Rico, next to Parque Urbano Dora Colón Clavell, in Barrio Cuarto. It depicts a young woman with her right arm stretched up high and holding a small depiction of the globe of the Earth on her hand. The monument was the first and, at the time, the only one of its kind "in Puerto Rico and the Caribbean". There is also a time capsule (5 August 1992 to 5 August 2092) that is buried at the back base of the monument.

The dedicatory plaque on the monument has an inscription that reads (Note: English translation is not part of the inscription, and it is given here to the right):

"Monumento a la Mujer"
Spanish
(original version)

A LA MUJER

Con este Monumento se honra
a la Mujer, que por su virtud,
esfuerzo y altas cualidades ha
contribuido brillantemente a
forjar la Historia y la Cultura,
logrando asi un sitial de
igualdad en el Mundo, siendo
siempre imagen de Belleza y
transmisora de la Vida.
5 de agosto de 1992

English
translation

TO THE WOMEN

This Monument honors
the Women, who for their virtue,
effort and high qualities has
contributed brilliantly to
forge History and Culture,
thus achieving a place of
equality in the World, being
always an image of Beauty and
the transmitter of Life.
5 August 1992

On May 29, 2014, The Legislative Assembly of Puerto Rico honored 12 illustrious women with plaques in the "La Plaza en Honor a la Mujer Puertorriqueña" (Plaza in Honor of Puerto Rican Women) in San Juan. They were the first to be honored. According to the plaques the following 12 women, who by virtue of their merits and legacies, stand out in the history of Puerto Rico. They are:

Name	Noted for	Year honored
Lola Rodríguez de Tió	First Puerto Rican-born woman poet to establish herself a reputation as a great poet, a believer in women's rights, committed to the abolition of slavery and the independence of Puerto Rico.	2014
Luisa Capetillo	Writer, labor organizer and an anarchist who fought for workers and women's rights.	2014
Felisa Rincón de Gautier	The first woman to be elected as the Mayor of a capital city in The Americas.	2014
Sor Isolina Ferré	Known as the "Mother Teresa of Puerto Rico", she received the Presidential Medal of Freedom in recognition of her humanitarian work.	2014
Rebekah Colberg	Known as the "Mother of Women's Sports in Puerto Rico"	2014
Josefina Barceló Bird de Romero	Civic leader and politician, leader of the Liberal Party of Puerto Rico.	2014
María Libertad Gómez Garriga	Educator, community leader, and politician. She was the only woman member of the constituent Assembly of Puerto Rico.	2014
María Luisa Arcelay de la Rosa	Educator, businesswoman and politician. She was first woman in Puerto Rico to be elected to a government legislative body.	2014
María Martínez Acosta de Pérez Almiroty	Educator, clubwoman and the first woman to be elected senator in Puerto Rico.	2014
Julia de Burgos	Poet, advocate of Puerto Rican independence, and civil rights activist for women and African/Afro-Caribbean writers.	2014
Sylvia Rexach	Comedy scriptwriter, poet, singer and composer of boleros.	2014
Gigi Fernández	Professional tennis player, the first Puerto-Rican-born athlete to win an Olympic gold medal and the first to be inducted into the International Tennis Hall of Fame.	2014

In 2015, the following women were also honored:

Name	Noted for	Year honored
Rosario Ferré Ramírez de Arellano	Writer, poet, and essayist.	2015
Ileana Colón Carlo	The first woman to be named Comptroller of Puerto Rico.	2015
Celeste Benítez	Educator, journalist and politician.	2015
Velda González	Actress, dancer, comedian, politician and former senator.	2015
Miriam Naveira de Merly	She was the first woman to serve on the Supreme Court of Puerto Rico as well as the first female Chief Justice	2015

=== Presidential Medal of Freedom ===
Five Puerto Rican women have been awarded the Presidential Medal of Freedom, an award bestowed by the president of the United States that is considered the highest civilian award in the United States. The medal recognizes those individuals who have made "an especially meritorious contribution to the security or national interests of the United States, world peace, cultural or other significant public or private endeavors". The following Puerto Rican women have been awarded the Presidential Medal of Freedom:

- Antonia Pantojas – educator, social worker, feminist, civil rights leader. Awarded in 1996.
- Isolina Ferré – nun. Awarded in 1999.
- Rita Moreno – actress, singer, and EGOT recipient. Awarded in 2004.
- Chita Rivera – actress, dancer, and singer. Awarded in 2009.
- Sylvia Mendez – civil rights activist. Awarded in 2011.

=== Presidential Citizens Medal ===
Two Puerto Rican women have been awarded the Presidential Citizens Medal, an award bestowed by the president of the United States that is considered the second highest civilian award in the United States, second only to the Presidential Medal of Freedom mentioned before. The medal recognizes individuals "who have performed exemplary deeds or services for his or her country or fellow citizens". The following Puerto Rican women have been awarded the Presidential Citizens Medal:

- Helen Rodriguez-Trias – pediatrician, educator, and leader in public health. Awarded in 2001.
- Victoria Leigh Soto – educator who was murdered in the Sandy Hook Elementary School shooting. while protecting the lives of her students. Posthumously awarded in 2013.

=== U.S. Postal Service commemorative stamps ===
Two women have been honored by the U.S. Postal Service Commemorative Stamp Program. On April 14, 2007, the U.S. Postal Service unveiled a stamp commemorating the Mendez v. Westminster case. Featured on the stamp are Felicitas Mendez (maiden name:Gomez), a native of Juncos, Puerto Rico and her husband, Gonzalo Mendez. The unveiling took take place during an event at Chapman University School of Education, Orange County, California, commemorating the 60th anniversary of the landmark case. On September 14, 2010, in a ceremony held in San Juan, the United States Postal Service honored Julia de Burgos's life and literary work with the issuance of a first class postage stamp, the 26th release in the postal system's Literary Arts series.

== Gallery of notable Puerto Rican women ==
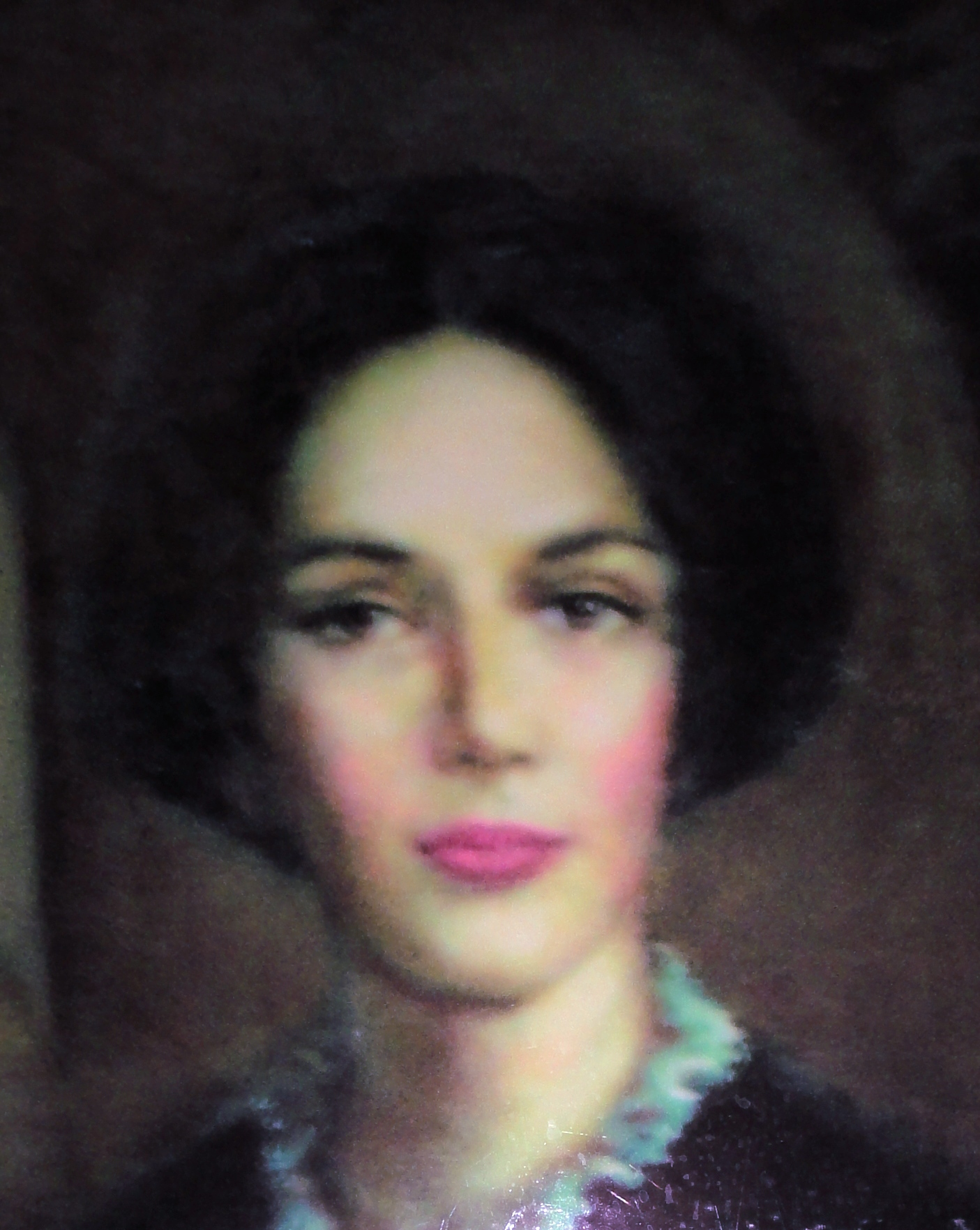
María de las Mercedes Barbudo (1773–1849)
Leader of the Puerto Rican independence movement

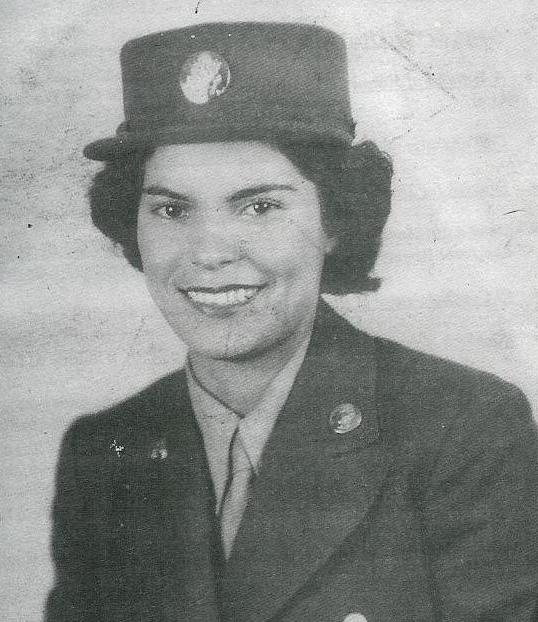
Carmen García Rosado
PFC WACs, author

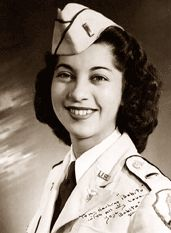
Carmen Lozano Dumler (1921–2015)
Lieutenant in the WACS

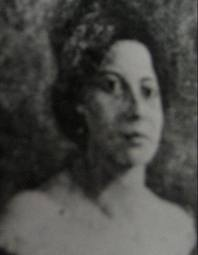
María Bibiana Benítez (1783–1873)
Puerto Rico's first female poet and playwrights

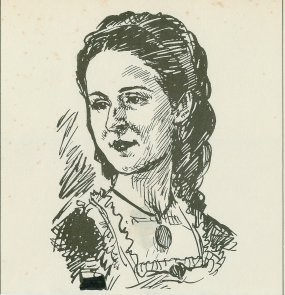
Alejandrina Benítez de Gautier (1819–1879)
Poet

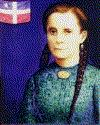
Mariana Bracetti (1825–1903)
Patriot and leader of the Puerto Rican independence revolt, El Grito de Lares in 1868

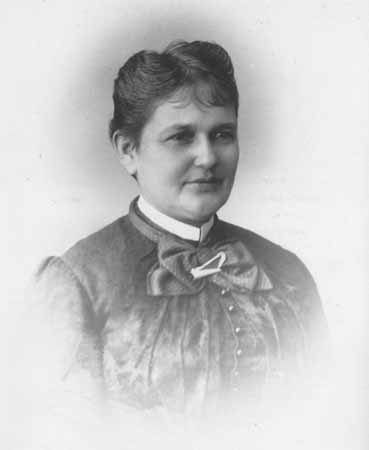
Lola Rodríguez de Tió (1843–1924)
Independence advocate and author of the revolutionary version of "La Boriqueña"

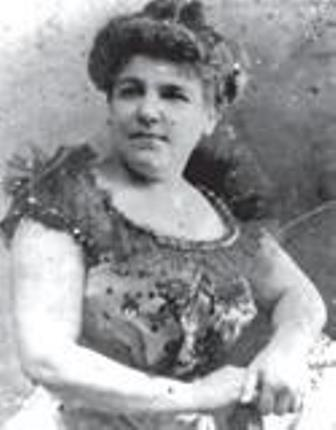
Amalia Paoli (1861–1941)
Opera soprano

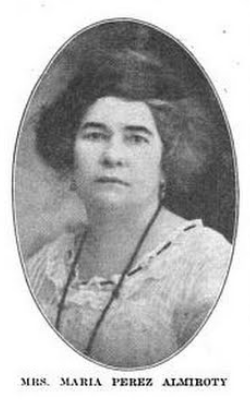
María de Pérez Almiroty (1883–1973)
First woman elected to the Senate of Puerto Rico (1936)

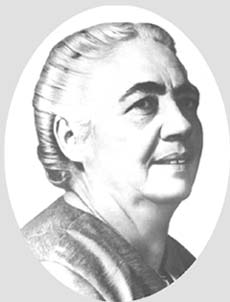
Juanita García Peraza (1897–1970)
Founder the Mita Congregation, a religion of Puerto Rican origin

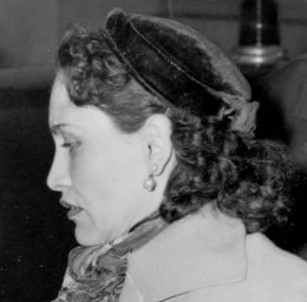
Lolita Lebrón (1919–2010)
Puerto Rican Nationalist leader

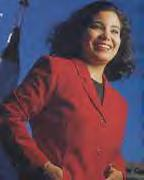
Lissette Martinez
NASA rocket scientist

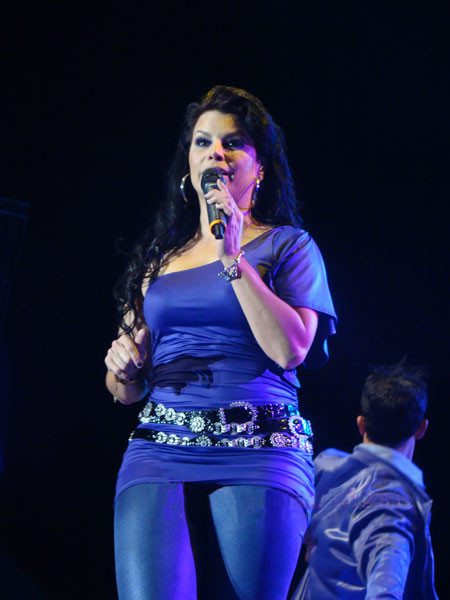
Olga Tañón
5 times Grammy winner

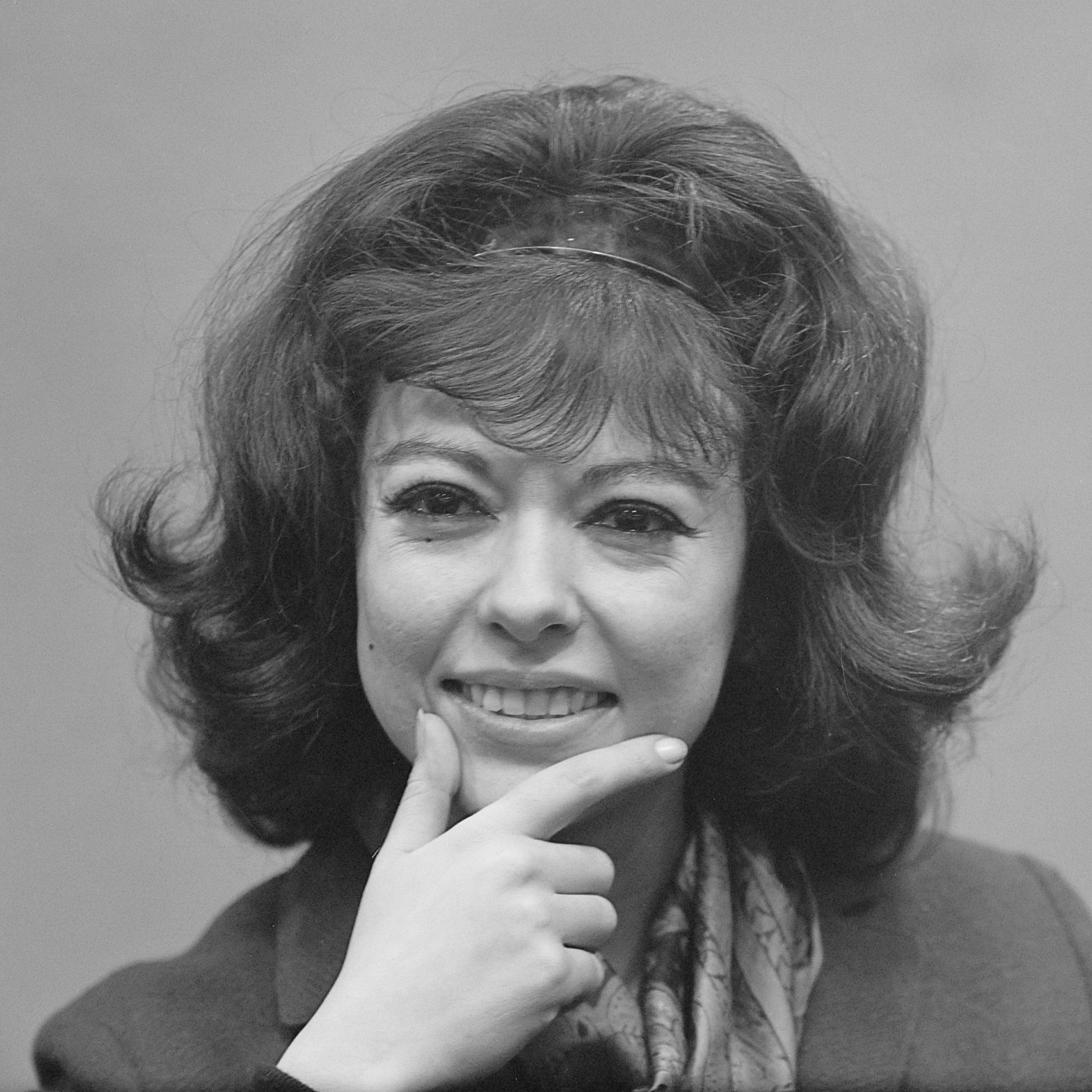
Rita Moreno
Actress and singer, recipient of EGOT and the Presidential Medal of Freedom

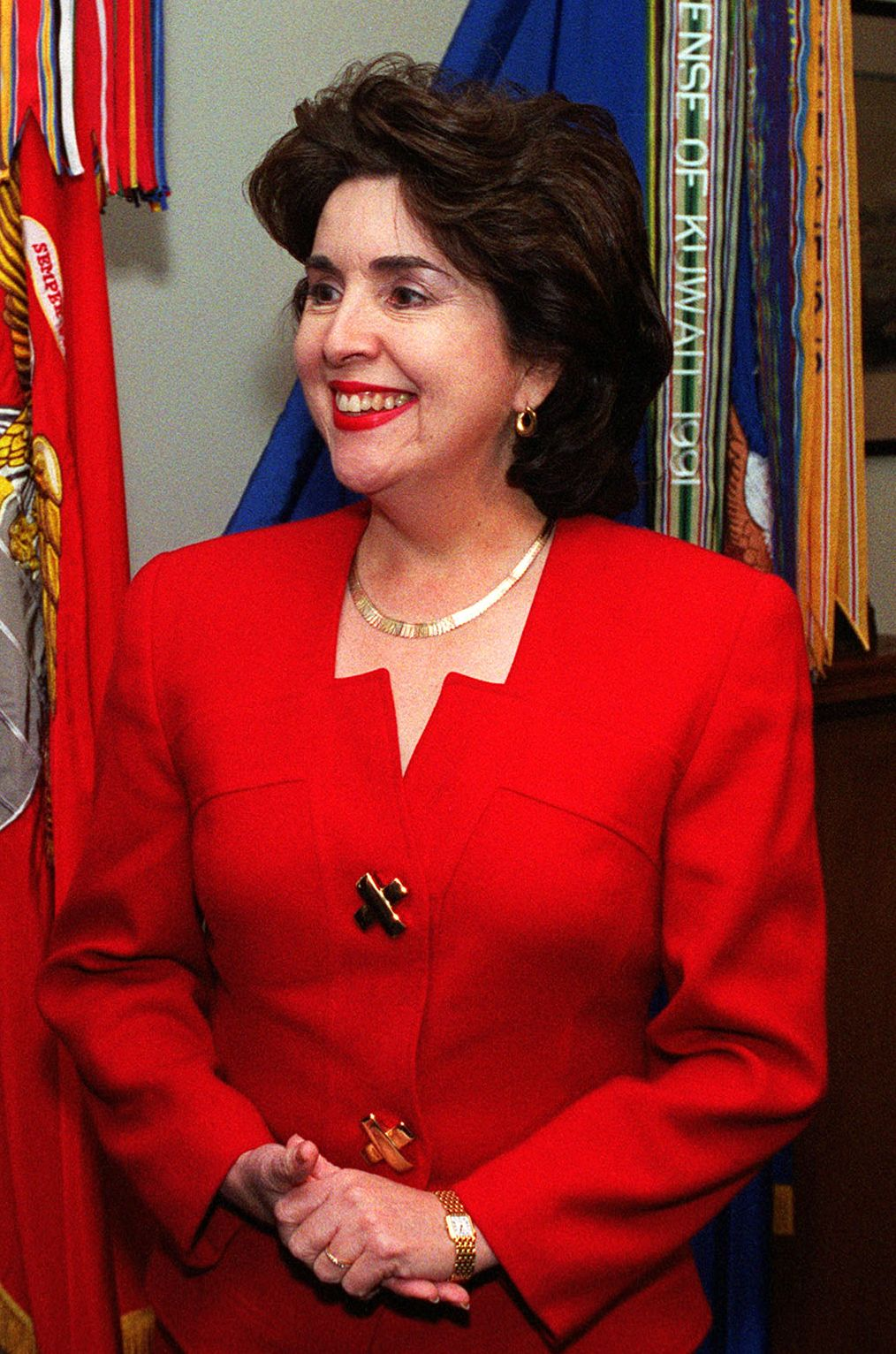
Sila María Calderón
Governor of Puerto Rico from 2001 to 2005

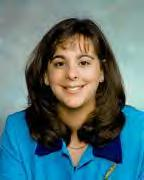
Monserrate Román
The Chief Microbiologist for the Environmental Control and Life Support System project in NASA

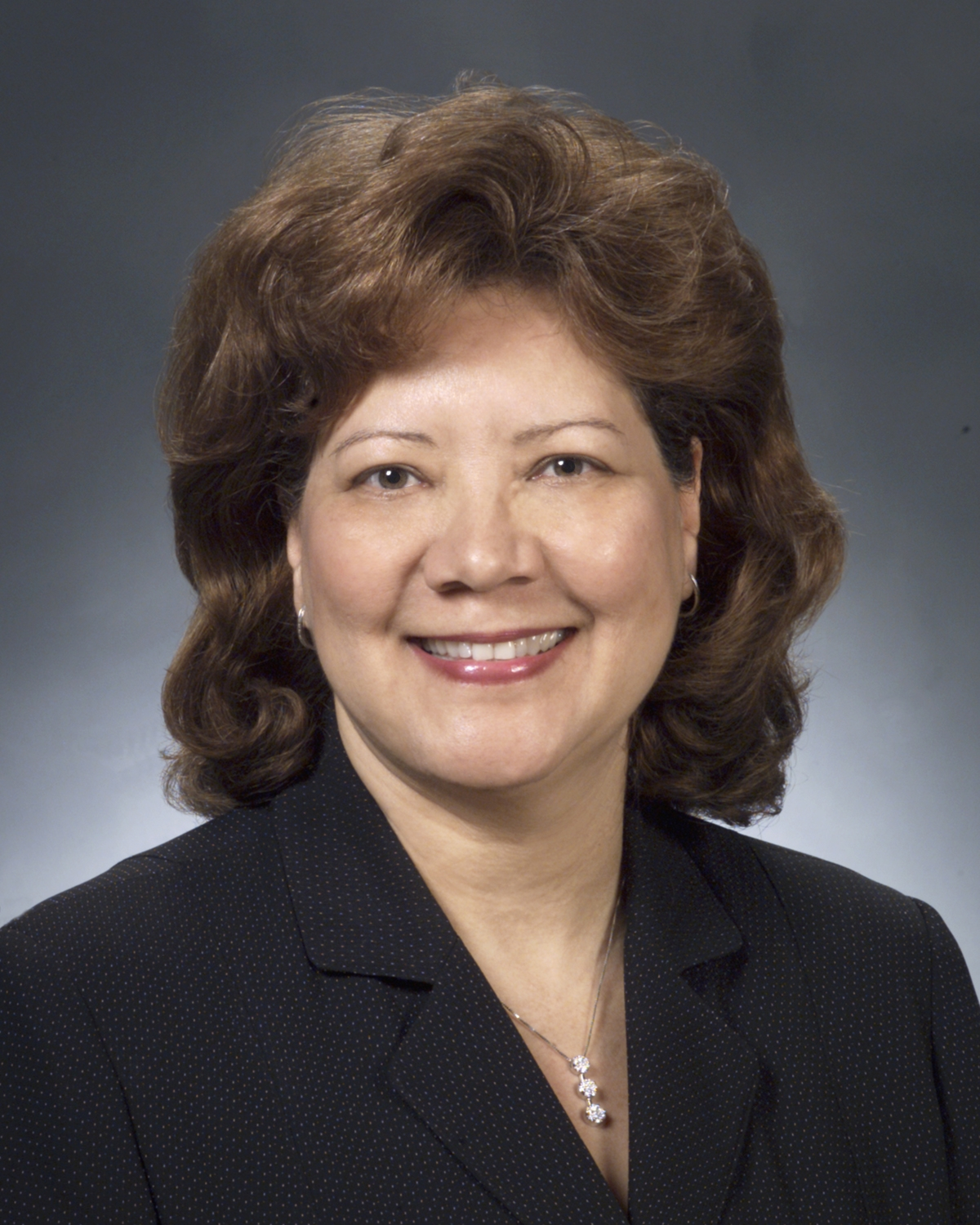
Olga D. González-Sanabria
Scientist and inventor

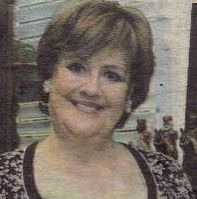
Delma S. Arrigoitia
Educator, author and historian

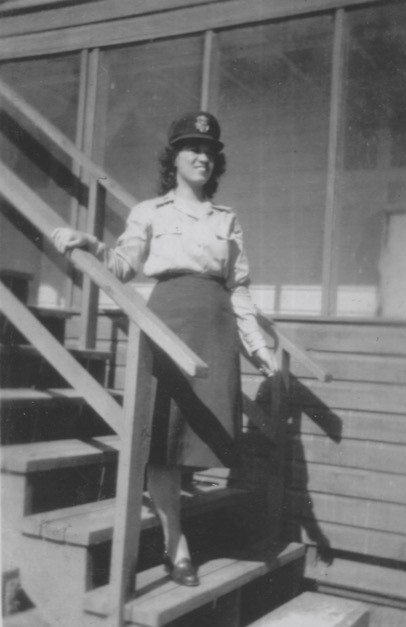
Carmen Vazquez Rivera
Centenarian. Veteran of World War II and the Korean War. Wife of politician and medical doctor Leopoldo Figueroa. 2022 LULAC Presidential Medal of Freedom recipient.

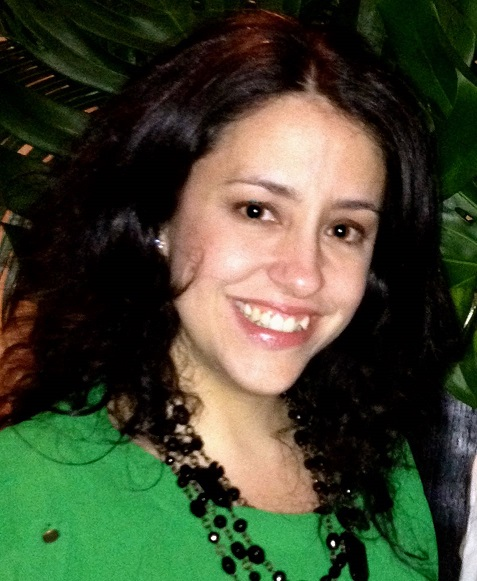
Teresita A. Levy
Educator, author and historian

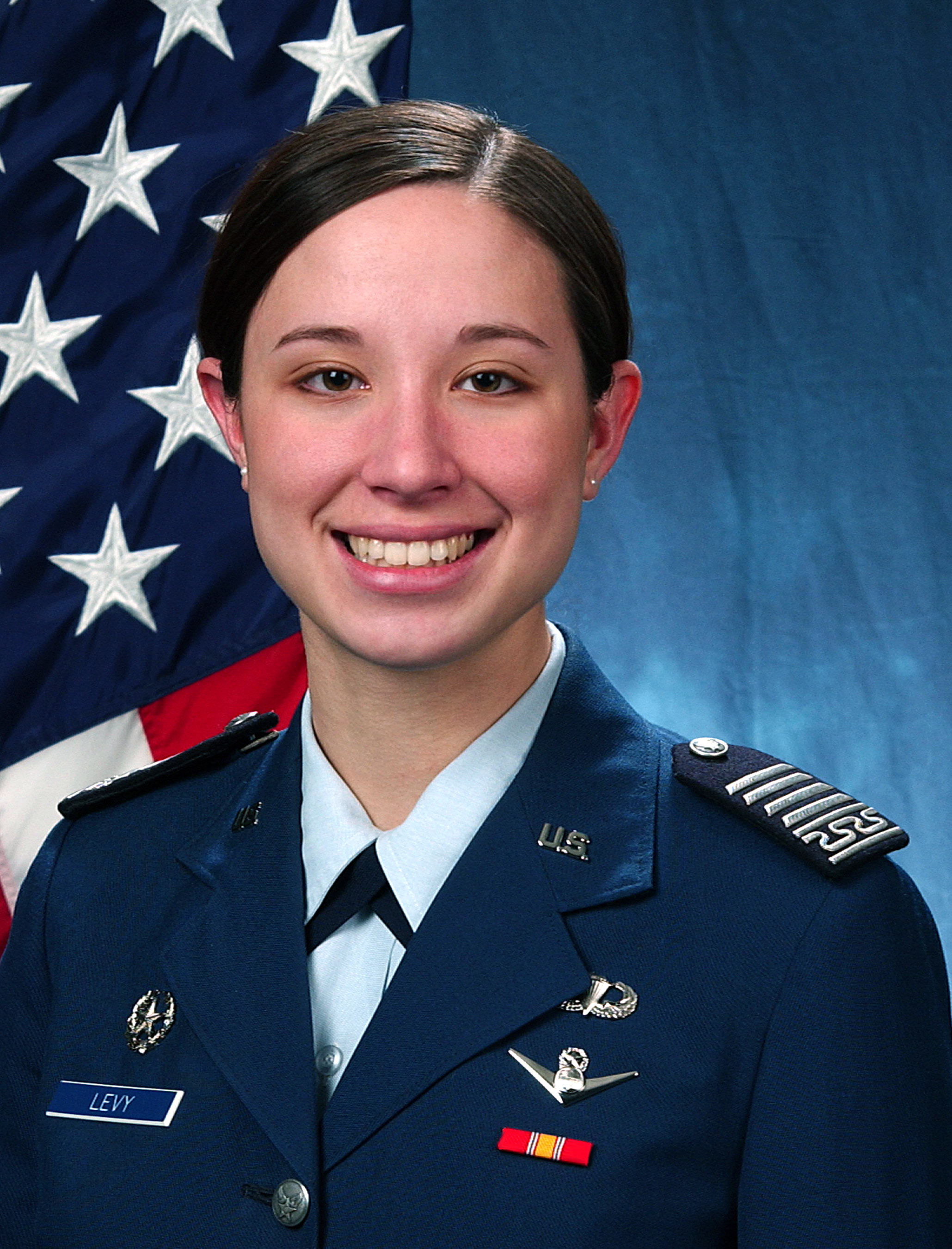
Hila Levy
Rhodes Scholar

== See also ==
- Puerto Rican women in the military
- List of Puerto Rican military personnel
- Puerto Ricans in World War II
- Sports in Puerto Rico
- Women in the Americas
