= Josefina Barceló Bird de Romero =

Puerto Rican politician

President of the Liberal Party of Puerto Rico
- In office 1938–1948
- Preceded by: María de Pérez Almiroty

Personal details
- Born: Maria Antonia Josefina Barceló Bird; February 14, 1901; Fajardo, Puerto Rico
- Died: April 15, 1979; San Juan, Puerto Rico
- Political party: Liberal Party
- Spouse: Antonio Romero Moreno
- Occupation: Civic leader and politician

Josefina Barceló Bird de Romero (Note: This name uses Spanish marriage naming customs; the first two are the maiden family name "Barceló Bird" and the second or matrimonial family name is "Romero".) (February 14, 1901 — April 15, 1979) was a Puerto Rican civic leader and politician, leader of the Liberal Party of Puerto Rico after the death of her father Antonio Rafael Barceló in 1938. She is one of the twelve women honored with a plaque in "La Plaza en Honor a la Mujer Puertorriqueña" (Plaza in Honor of Puerto Rican Women), in San Juan.

== Early life ==
Maria Antonia Josefina Barceló Bird was born in Fajardo, Puerto Rico, the daughter of lawyer and politician Antonio Rafael Barceló and Maria Georgina "Josefina" Bird Arias. Her paternal grandfather, Jaime José Barceló Miralles, was an immigrant to Puerto Rico from Palma, Majorca; her maternal grandfather, Jorge Bird León, was a sugar manufacturer. Josefina Barceló Bird finished her education at the College of the Sacred Heart, a convent school in Kenwood, Albany, New York.

== Career ==
After literate Puerto Rican women gained the vote in 1929, Josefina Barceló de Romero worked on woman-to-woman voter education efforts in San Juan, and she was active in the women's organization of the Liberal Party. Among her responsibilities was arranging childcare, meals, and transportation for new women voters. She joined the Central Board of the Liberal Party in 1936. Josefina Barceló Bird de Romero was elected president of the Liberal Party after her father died in 1938. She was the first woman elected to lead a major political party in Puerto Rico. She continued to hold leadership positions in the party until she resigned and the party dissolved in 1948. She ran unsuccessfully for an at-large Senate seat in 1944.

== Personal life and legacy ==
Josefina Barceló Bird married Antonio Romero Moreno in 1918. They had three children (Gloria, Calixto, Carlos) and also raised Antonio's nephew. Her son Carlos Romero Barceló was elected mayor of San Juan in 1968, and later served as Governor of Puerto Rico; in 2017, he was appointed shadow senator representing Puerto Rico in the United States Senate.

Josefina Barceló de Romero died in 1979, aged 77 years. She is one of the twelve women honored with a plaque in the "Plaza en Honor a la Mujer Puertorriqueña" (Plaza in Honor of Puerto Rican Women) in San Juan. There is a public elementary school named for Josefina Barceló, at Bayamón, Puerto Rico.

== See also ==
- List of Puerto Ricans
- History of women in Puerto Rico
