= Deirdre Connelly =

Puerto Rican business professional

Deirdre P. Connelly
- Born: 1961 (age 64–65); San Juan, Puerto Rico
- Education: Lycoming College (BA)
- Occupations: Chairman, Genmab A/S, President of North America Pharmaceuticals for GlaxoSmithKline

Deirdre P. Connelly (born in 1961) is a Puerto Rican business professional. Connelly is Chairman of the Board of the European Biotech company Genmab A/S, member of the Boards of Macy’s Inc. and the Lincoln Financial Group. Connelly was past President of North America Pharmaceuticals for GlaxoSmithKline from 2009-2015. Connelly is the first woman to hold that title, and one of only two women on GSK's corporate executive team. She is a member of the global Corporate Executive Team and co-chairs the Portfolio Management Board, along with the Chairman of Research and Development.

== Early years ==
Connelly, the middle child of nine, was born to Irish-American Owen Connelly and Puerto Rican mother Dolores Montecinos in San Juan, Puerto Rico, where she spent the first 18 years of her life. Connolly earned a bachelor's degree in economics and marketing from Lycoming College in Pennsylvania in 1983. She attended Harvard University's Advanced Management Program in 2000. She currently resides in Philadelphia and has fourteen nieces and nephews, from ages 10 to 35. Connelly plays guitar recreationally.

== Career ==
Before joining GSK in 2009, Connelly worked at Eli Lilly and Company for 24 years. In 1984, Connelly became a sales representative for Eli Lilly in San Juan. By 1988, she became sales manager for Lilly in Puerto Rico. In 1995, she became general manager for Eli Lilly Puerto Rico, and, in 1997, she became the regional sales director for the Caribbean region. Connolly headed the women's health business unit at Lilly's US affiliate in 2000, where she oversaw the successful implementation of the global marketing campaign for osteoporosis treatment Evista. She became head of the Women’s Health Business at Lilly’s United States affiliate from 2000 until 2003. From 2003 to 2004, Connelly served as executive director in the Human Resources Department of Lilly's U.S. Operations division during which time she oversaw a reconfiguration of its sales force. Then, she served as President for Lilly USA division of Lilly, from June 1, 2005 to January 2009.

In addition to her role at GSK, in 2014 she served as a Director on the Pharmaceutical Research and Manufacturers of America Board, the Macy’s Inc. Board and the Harvard University Public Health Policy Council.

She joined the board of Sarepta in September 2024. In 2026, she is on the boards at Lincoln Financial Group and Macy's Corporation. She is also chair of Genmab A/B.

== 50 most powerful women in business ==
For 8 consecutive years (2007-2014) Connolly was recognized by Fortune magazine as one of the 50 most powerful women in business.

In April 2010, she was named Woman of the Year by the Healthcare Businesswomen's Association.

In 2007 she was appointed to President Bush Commission on White House Fellowships, where she helped in the selection of the White House Fellows, a prestigious annual program that fosters leadership and public service.

== See also ==
- List of Puerto Ricans
- History of women in Puerto Rico
