= Carmela Eulate Sanjurjo =

Puerto Rican-born poet

- Born: August 30, 1878; San Juan, Puerto Rico
- Died: July 3, 1961 (aged 82); Barcelona, Spain
- Occupation: writer

Carmela Eulate Sanjurjo (August 30, 1871 – July 3, 1961) was a Puerto Rican writer, translator, painter, pianist, singer, musicologist and music critic. She is considered a pioneer in the feminist movement of the Antillean zone, a position that has been reflected in her literary works and essays.

== Biography ==
Eulate was born on August 30, 1871, in San Juan, Puerto Rico. Her father was Antonio Eulate y Fery, commander and admiral of the Spanish Navy and diplomat; her mother was Julia Fernández Sanjurjo of Spanish descent. Because of her father's occupation, she lived in various countries, an activity that enriched her.

Eulate grew up in a family that gave her a privileged education. Since she was a child, she was interested in reading. From a very young age, she participated in literary and political gatherings in which figures from Puerto Rico such as Salvador Brau, Manuel Fernández Juncos, Manuel Zeno Gandía, Ana Roque de Duprey and José Julián Acosta also attended. She studied music, painting and languages and over time came to master different languages such as Arabic, Russian, German, Italian, English, French and Catalan. She obtained the title of the Conservatory of Music of Puerto Rico and in Cuba, she received classes from the famous pianist Hubert de Blanck. Starting in 1908, the family lived for a few years in the Canary Islands, where Eulate frequented the writers' gatherings. After her father had moved to the reserve, starting in 1911, the family settled in Barcelona, where Eulate resided until her death in 1961.

== Selected works ==
- La muñeca (1895)
- La familia de Robredo (1907)
- Marqués y marquesa (1911)
- Cántigas de amor, traducciones del árabe (1920)
- El asombroso doctor Jover (1930)
