= List of University of Puerto Rico people =

This list of University of Puerto Rico people includes alumni, faculty, and presidents of University of Puerto Rico systemwide.

== U.S. armed forces ==
- Ricardo Aponte, brigadier general, U.S. Air Force
- Salvador E. Felices, major general, U.S. Air Force
- Jacob Lozada, colonel, U.S. Army, assistant secretary of veterans affairs
- José Antonio Muñiz, lieutenant colonel, U.S. Air Force; together with then-Colonels Alberto A. Nido and Mihiel Gilormini he founded the Puerto Rico Air National Guard; the Air National Guard Base at the San Juan International airport in Puerto Rico, was renamed "Muñiz Air National Guard Base" in his honor in 1963
- Antonio J. Ramos, brigadier general, U.S. Air Force
- Pedro N. Rivera, brigadier general, U.S. Air Force

== Business ==
- Gildo Massó, founder and CEO of Masso Enterprises

== Sports ==
- Bernie Williams, former New York Yankees center fielder, MLB

== Science ==
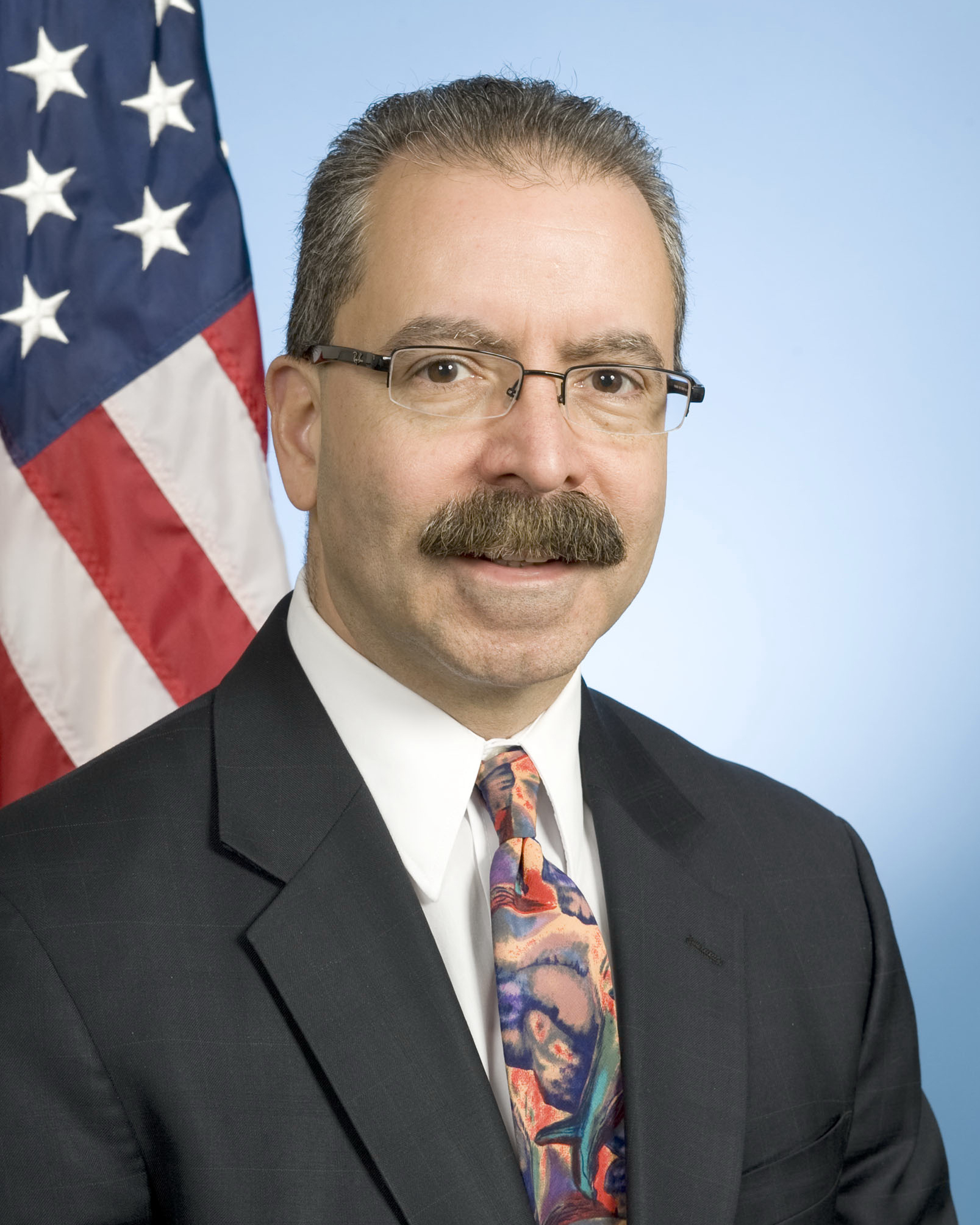
Orlando Figueroa

- Ricardo Alegría, scholar, cultural anthropologist and archeologist known as the "father of modern Puerto Rican archaeology"
- Rafael L. Bras, American civil engineer, current provost of Georgia Institute of Technology
- Nitza Margarita Cintron, scientist, currently the chief of space medicine and health care systems at NASA
- Marcia Cruz-Correa, physician-scientist and gastroenterologist
- Orlando Figueroa, director of the Mars Exploration Program in NASA
- Enectalí Figueroa-Feliciano, astrophysicist and researcher with NASA who pioneered the development position-sensitive detectors
- Adolfo Figueroa-Viñas, Ph.D., first Puerto Rican astrophysicist at NASA; expert in solar and space plasma physics at the Heliophysics Science Division
- Joxel García, Puerto Rican physician and former four-star admiral in the U.S. Public Health Service Commissioned Corps
- Grizelle González, ecologist at the Sabana Field Research Station
- Sixto Gonzalez, first Puerto Rican to be named director of the Arecibo Observatory, the world's largest single-dish radio telescope
- Olga D. González-Sanabria, Puerto Rican scientist and inventor and the highest-ranking Hispanic at NASA Glenn Research Center
- Amri Hernandez-Pellerano, Puerto Rican electronics engineer and scientist
- Ramón López Irizarry, educator and scientist who invented "Coco Lopez"
- Ada Monzón, first female Puerto Rican meteorologist and founder of the Museum of Science Puerto Rico
- Antonio Mignucci, biological oceanographer specializing in the biology, management and conservation of marine mammals
- Enrique Pérez Santiago, first Puerto Rican hematologist, began the formal program at the University of Puerto Rico Hospital
- Mercedes Reaves, Puerto Rican research engineer and scientist
- Pedro Rodriguez, director of a test laboratory at NASA and inventor
- Helen Rodriguez Trias, women's rights activist and recipient of the Presidential Citizen's Medal

== Liberal arts ==
- Magali Carrasquillo, actress and teacher
- Juan Antonio Corretjer, poet, journalist and pro-independence political activist opposing United States rule in Puerto Rico
- Luz Odilia Font, actress
- Luis Roberto Guzmán, musician, TV and film actor, two-time nominee for "TVyNovela" awards
- Enrique Laguerre, writer, poet, teacher and critic
- Samuel Molina, actor, writer, poet and comedian
- Rubén Sánchez, main radio news personality at Univisión Radio (WKAQ-AM); anchorman of several TV daily news interview programs

== Law and politics ==
- Aníbal Acevedo Vilá (B.A. 1982, J.D. 1985), 8th governor of Puerto Rico (2005–2009), U.S. representative (resident commissioner), D-Puerto Rico (2001–2004), state representative, Puerto Rico House of Representatives (1992–1999).
- José Aponte (B.B.A. 1980), state representative, Puerto Rico House of Representatives (2001–present).
- Norma Burgos (B.A., M.P.A.), state senator, Puerto Rico Senate (2001–present)
- Sila M. Calderón (M.P.A.), 7th governor of Puerto Rico (2001–2005), mayor of San Juan, Puerto Rico (1997–2001)
- Antonio Fas Alzamora (J.D.), state senator, Puerto Rico Senate (1977–present), state representative, Puerto Rico House of Representatives (1973–1977)
- Ruth Fernández, former senator, Puerto Rico Senate
- Rogelio Figueroa, 2008 gubernatorial candidate for the Puerto Ricans for Puerto Rico (PPR) party
- Miguel A. García Méndez, former speaker of the Puerto Rico House of Representatives
- Rafael Hernández Colón, 4th governor of Puerto Rico; first term 1973–1977, second term 1985–1993; state senator, Puerto Rico Senate (1969–1973)
- Hans Hertell, former U.S. ambassador to the Dominican Republic
- Jesús T. Piñero, first native Puerto Rican to be appointed governor of Puerto Rico by the Government of the United States
- Juan Mari Brás, advocate for Puerto Rican independence from the United States; founded the Puerto Rican Socialist Party (PSP)
- Wilfredo Mattos Cintrón, teacher at the university, advocate of Puerto Rican independence who was, along with Mari Brás, a member of the PSP
- Kenneth McClintock, current secretary of state of Puerto Rico, fulfilling the role of lieutenant governor (first-in-line of succession) in the U.S. territory
- Adolfo L. Monserrate Anselmi, former state representative, Puerto Rico House of Representatives
- Luis Negrón López, state senator, Puerto Rico Senate
- Carlos Romero Barceló (J.D. 1956), U.S. representative (resident commissioner), D-Puerto Rico (1993–2000), 5th governor of Puerto Rico (1977–1985), state senator, Puerto Rico Senate (1986–1988), mayor of San Juan, Puerto Rico (1969–1977)
- Pedro Rosselló (M.P.H. 1981), 6th governor of Puerto Rico (1993–2001), state senator, Puerto Rico Senate (2005–2008)
- Nydia Velázquez (B.A. 1974), U.S. representative, D-New York (1993–present)
- Carlos M. García Zambrana, politician

== Other ==
- Juan Miguel Betancourt, Catholic bishop
- F. Javier Cevallos, president of Kutztown University of Pennsylvania
- Danyeshka Hernández, Miss Universe Puerto Rico 2017
- Luis S. Fraticelli, FBI director for Puerto Rico
- Carmen Rivera de Alvarado, social worker, educator and activist
- Soraya Marcano, visual artist
- Mariblanca Sabas Alomá, Cuban feminist and journalist
- Carlos E. Santiago, current chancellor of the University of Wisconsin–Milwaukee and chief executive officer in Hispanic College Fund
- María Reinat-Pumarejo, activist

== Notable faculty ==
- Eugenio S. Belaval
- Ruben Berrios, law professor at the University of Puerto Rico's Law School
- Facundo Bueso Sanllehí, Guggenheim Fellow, physicist and educator
- Carlos Díaz Olivo, candidate for mayor of San Juan in 1992, corporate law professor
- Victoria Espinosa, professor of Theatre
- Edwin Irizarry Mora, candidate for governor of Puerto Rico in the 2008, professor of economics
- Juan Ramón Jiménez, Spanish poet, prolific writer who received the Nobel Prize in Literature in 1956
- Luce López-Baralt, professor of Spanish and comparative literature at the University of Puerto Rico, Rio Piedras
- Carolina Marcial Dorado, Spanish language professor
- Roberto Sánchez Vilella, second governor of the Commonwealth of Puerto Rico 1965–1969
- Luisa R. Seijo Maldonado, (MSW 1972) activist, social worker and professor at the University of Puerto Rico, Mayagüez
- Pedro Juan Soto, Puerto Rican writer
- Rexford Tugwell, served as the last appointed American governor of Puerto Rico 1941–1946, served as chancellor of the University of Puerto Rico

== Presidents ==
President	Years
Prof. Jaime Benitez	1966–1971
Dr. Amador Cobas	1971–1973
Dr. Arturo Morales Carrion	1973–1977
Dr. Ismael Almodovar	1977–1985
Lic. Fernando Agrait	1985–1990
Dr. Jose M. Saldana	1990–1993
Dr. Norman Maldonado	1993–2001
Lic. Antonio García Padilla	2001–2009
Dr. Jose Ramon de la Torre	2010–2011
Dr. Miguel Muñoz	2011-2013

== Alumni associations ==
- Association of the University of Puerto Rico Alumni and Friends Abroad (UPRAA)
