= List of Puerto Ricans in the United States Space Program =

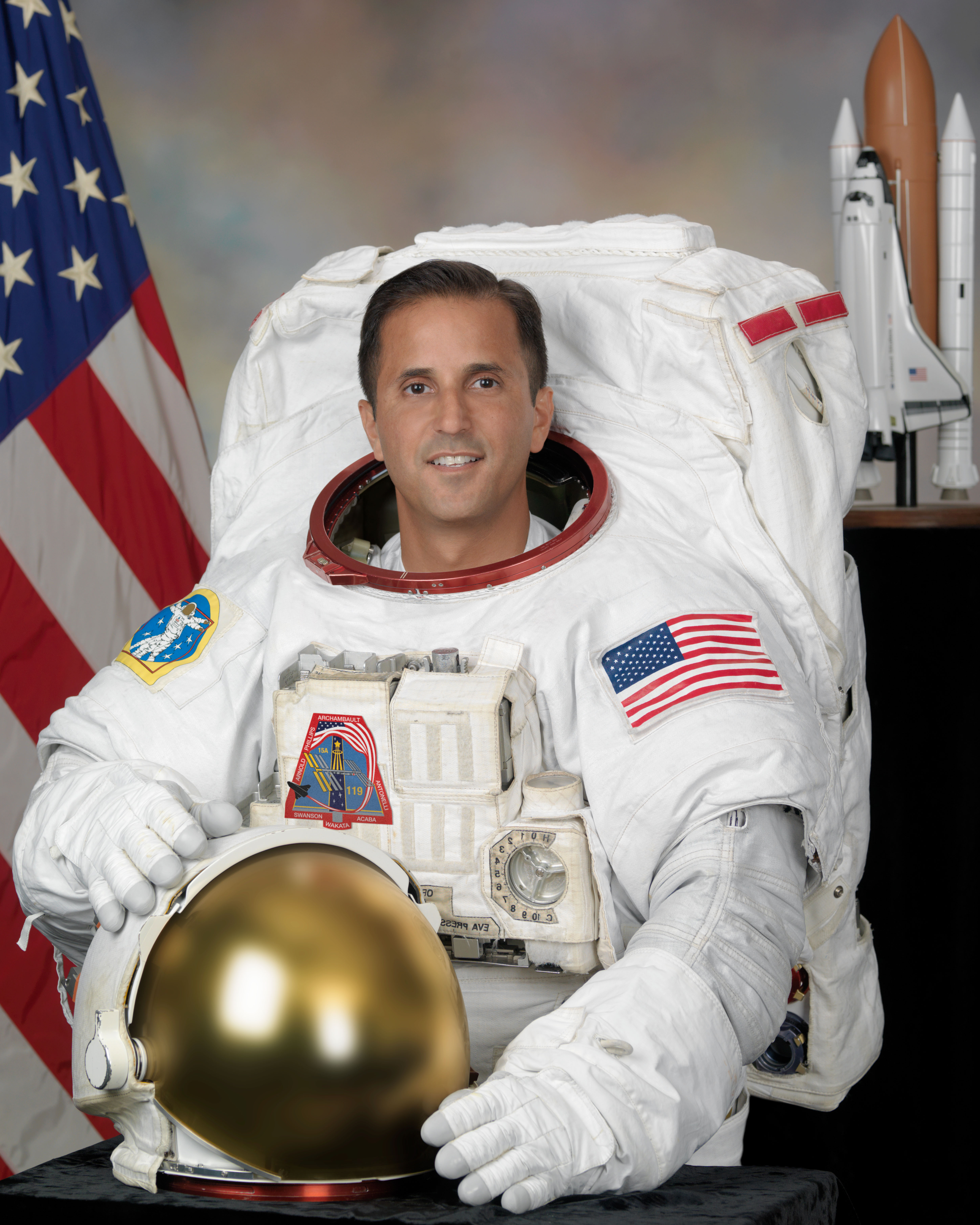
Joseph M. Acaba

This is a list of notable Puerto Rican scientists involved in the United States Space Program, also known as the National Aeronautics and Space Administration (NASA) and their contributions to said program. This list is not limited to Puerto Ricans born in Puerto Rico, it also includes people of Puerto Rican descent born elsewhere. According to an article written by Margarita Santori Lopez for the official newspaper of the University of Puerto Rico's Mayagüez Campus, "Prensa RUM", as of 2003, of the 114 Hispanics working at NASA Goddard Space Flight Center in Maryland, 70 were Puerto Ricans or of Puerto Rican descent.

Puerto Ricans and people of Puerto Rican descent, both men and women, have reached top positions in NASA, serving in sensitive leadership positions. On May 6, 2004, Joseph M. Acaba became the first person of Puerto Rican heritage to be named as a NASA astronaut candidate, when he was selected as a member of NASA Astronaut Training Group 19. On an average, only the top 4% of the qualified applicants are selected as finalists, and are invited to the Johnson Space Center in Houston for interviews for a position in the Astronaut Candidate Class. Out of the finalist group, an average of only 0.63% are selected to become an Astronaut Candidate. Other notable individuals who have reached finalist status include: Nitza Margarita Cintron, Astronaut Class 8 (1978), Carlos Ortiz Longo, Astronaut Class 16 (1996)., Enectalí Figueroa-Feliciano, Astronaut Class 19 (2004) and Class 20 (2009), and Vanessa Aponte Williams, Astronaut Class 20 (2009) and Class 21 (2012).

== Joseph M. Acaba ==
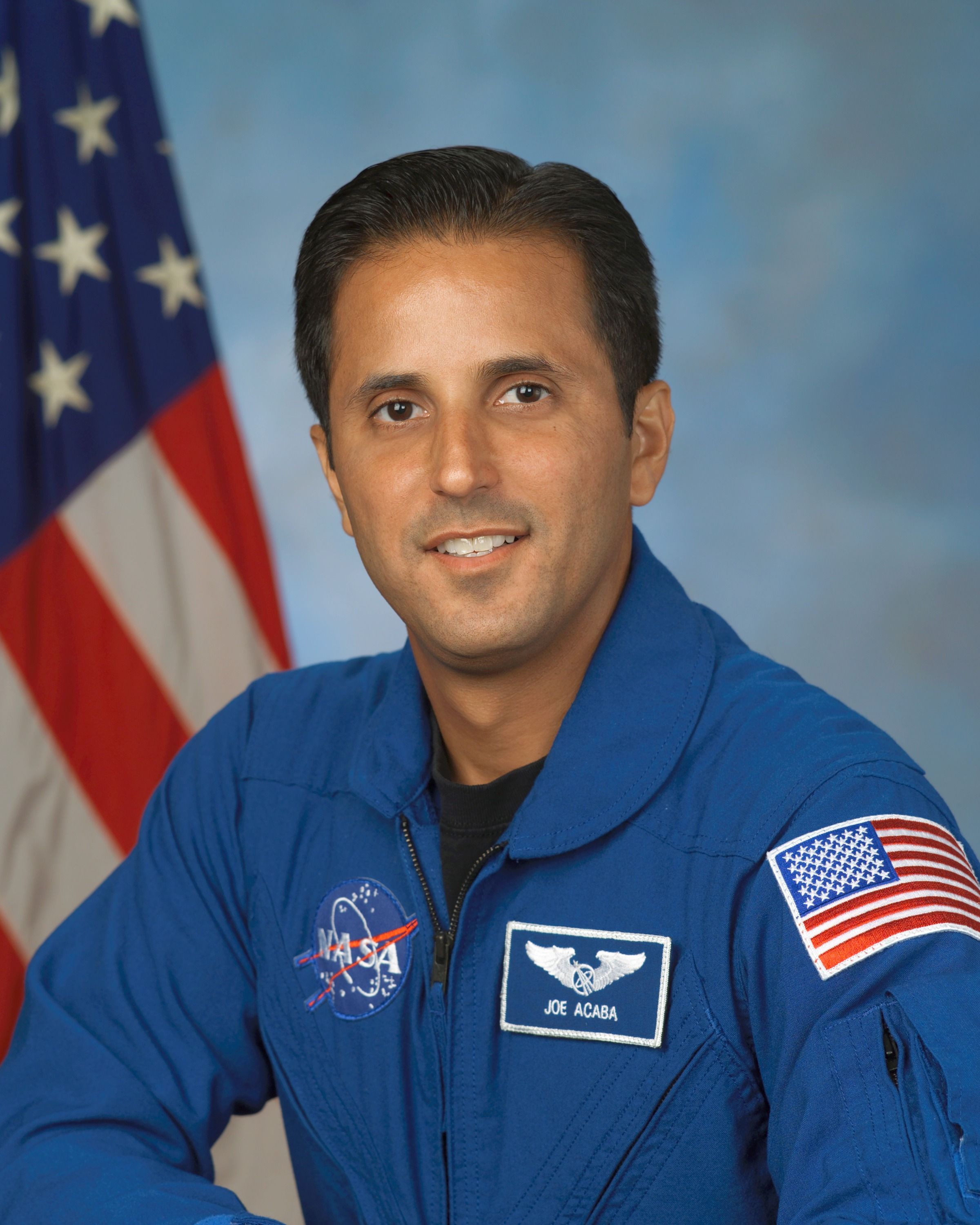
Joseph M. Acaba

External videos
- Joseph Michael "Joe" Acaba and Suni Williams during a Social Media Event aboard the International Space Station

Astronaut.

In May 2004 Acaba became the first person of Puerto Rican heritage to be named as a NASA astronaut candidate, when he was selected as a member of NASA Astronaut Training Group 19. He completed his training on February 10, 2006, and was assigned to STS-119, which flew from March 15 to March 28, 2009, to deliver the final set of solar arrays to the International Space Station.; Statistics

#	Spacecraft launch	Launch date	Mission	Spacecraft landing	Landing date	Duration	Spacewalk times	Spacewalk duration
1	Discovery STS-119	15 March 2009, 23:43UTC	STS-119	Discovery STS-119	28 March 2009, 19:13 UTC	12 days 19 hours 29 minutes	2	12 hours 57 minutes
2	Soyuz TMA-04M	15 May 2012, 03:01 UTC	ISS-31 / ISS-32	Soyuz TMA-04M	17 September 2012, 02:52 UTC	124 days 23 hours 51 minutes	0	0
3	Soyuz MS-06	12 September 2017, 21:17 UTC	ISS-53 / ISS-54	Soyuz MS-06	28 February 2018	168 days 5 hours 13 minutes	1	6 hours 49 minutes
						306 days 34 minutes	3	19 hours 46 minutes

== Roberto Alemán ==
Electronics Engineer, Aero-Space Technologist Environmental Instruments Director at NASA Goddard Space Flight Center in Maryland. Alemán directs everything that is related to the environmental instruments which the United States provides to the European Space Agency in order to operate the MetOp, a European satellite that provides environmental information to both Europe and the United States.

== Vanessa Aponte Williams, Ph.D. ==
Chemical and aerospace engineer, Director of Cross Program Integration, SLD Lunar Lander, Blue Origin

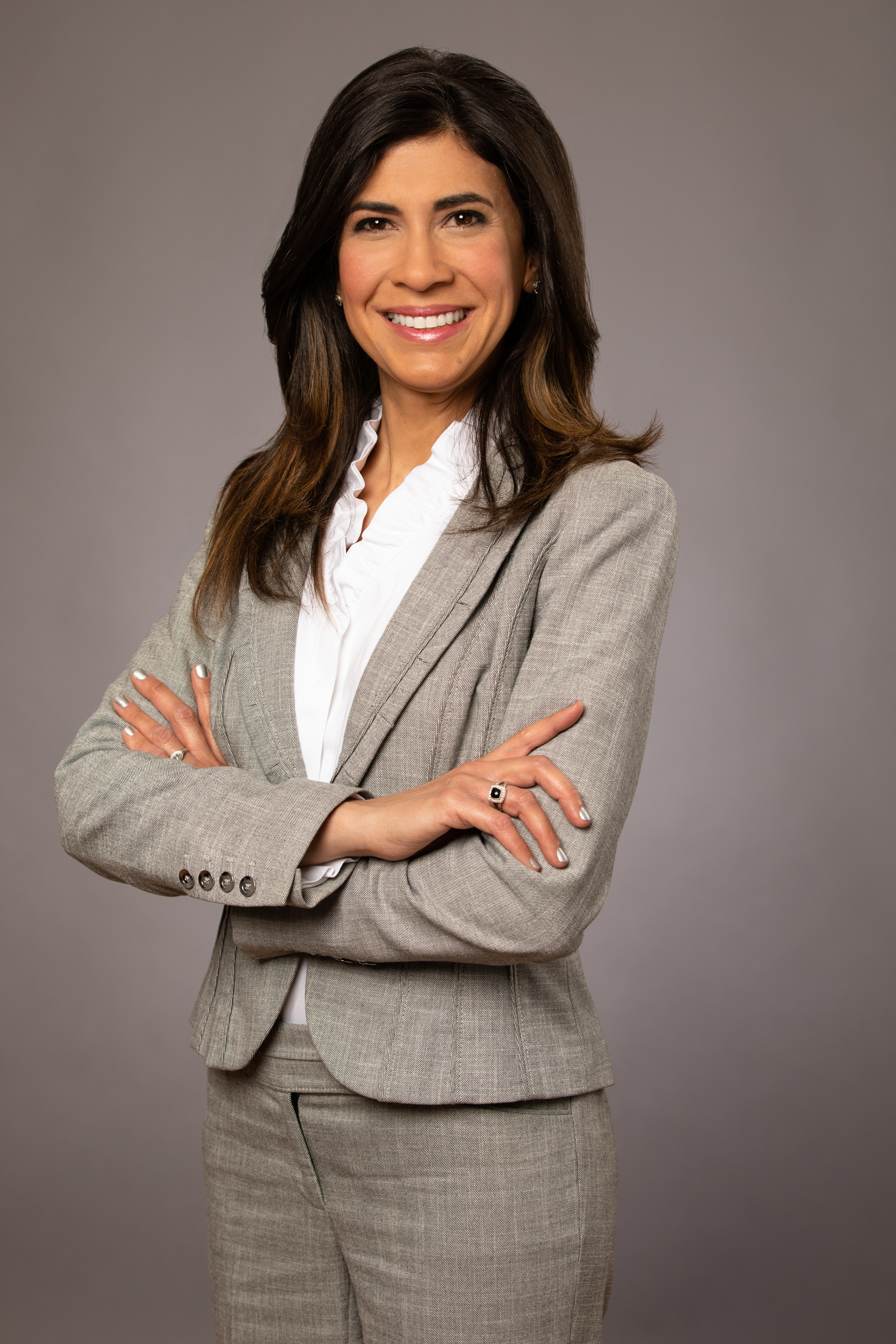
Vanessa Aponte Williams was born and raised in Lajas, Puerto Rico

Dr. Vanessa Aponte Williams is the Director of Cross Program Integration for the Blue Moon Lunar Lander at Blue Origin. She has 25+ years of experience in the aerospace industry, primarily devoted to human spaceflight and systems engineering. Prior to leading Advanced Programs for Human Space at Lockheed Martin, she worked in the areas of advanced life support, as well as controls, dynamics and propulsion at NASA Kennedy, Dryden, and Johnson Space Centers. She joined Lockheed Martin as a senior systems engineer in 2006; one of her most notable roles held within the Orion Multi-purpose Crew Vehicle program, where she led the Cross-Cutting Integration Team in tackling high-visibility, short-turnaround challenges. After Orion, Vanessa also led the New Technology Insertion Board as well as oversaw the technical and programmatic scrutiny of critical U.S. spaceflight assets as risk and opportunity manager within the Special Programs Line of Business. Outside her career at Lockheed Martin, Vanessa has had the distinction of being selected as a finalist and undergoing the Astronaut Selection Interview process at NASA Johnson Space Center twice (2009 & 2012). Throughout her career at Lockheed Martin, Vanessa has been intimately involved with leadership development, STEM and volunteerism. She is also a former member of Rocky Mountain Rescue Group. Vanessa was born and raised in Puerto Rico. She received a B.S. and M.S. in chemical engineering from UPR at Mayagüez and a Ph.D. in aerospace engineering sciences from CU Boulder.

== Adán Rodriguez-Arroyo ==
Electronics Engineer, Aero-Space Technologist

Stationed at NASA Goddard Space Flight Center in Maryland for over 28 years, and 35 at NASA overall, Rodríguez-Arroyo was the Communications System Lead Engineer for the Lunar Reconnaissance Orbiter Mission (LRO), launched in June 2009, the Magnetospheric MultiScale Mission (MMS) mission, launched in 2015, and the Plankton, Aerosol, Cloud, ocean Ecosystem (PACE) mission, launched in 2024.

Rodriguez-Arroyo earned his BSEE from the University of Puerto Rico (UPR-Ponce and UPR-Mayagüez) and his MSEE from the Whiting School of Engineering at Johns Hopkins University. He was born in Peñuelas, Puerto Rico. He retired from NASA Goddard in January 2026.

== Renán Borelli ==
Mechanical Engineer, Aero-Space Technologist

SWIFT satellite instrumentation manager at NASA Goddard Space Center in Maryland. The Swift is a multi-wavelength space-based observatory dedicated to the study of gamma-ray burst (GRB) science.

== Anthony M. Busquets ==
Electronics Engineer, Aero-Space Technologist

Stationed at NASA Langley Research Center in Hampton, Virginia, his responsibilities include the development and application of multifunction control/display switch technology in 1983 and Development and application of a microprocessor-based I/O system for simulator use in 1984.

NASA Awards and Recognitions:

1986-Certification of Recognition (NASA Tech Brief Publication), 1987, 92-Certificate of Recognition (NASA Innovation Disclosure), 1992-NASA Team Excellence Award, 1993-Certificate of Outstanding Performance, 1995, 97-NASA Performance Award.

He is the author and or co-author of over 13 conference papers and NASA formal publications in the areas of cockpit controls and displays, use of stereoscopy in flight displays and pictorial flight displays for situation awareness enhancement.

== Miguel Alvarez Chico ==
Computer Engineer, Aero-Space Technologist

System Hardware Design Engineer for the Aft-Deck Simulator and the Cockpit Motion Facilitya at NASA Langley Research Center in Hampton, Virginia. He is also the Assistant Systems Engineer, General Aviation Simulator (reactivation) - support of the AWIN research study (1998–2002).

NASA Awards and Recognitions:

1997, 2000-Achievement Award.

== Nitza Margarita Cintron ==
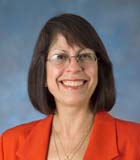
Nitza Margarita Cintron

Chief of Space Medicine and Health Care Systems Office at NASA's Johnson Space Center.

In 1979, Cintron was the originator of the Biochemistry Laboratory at the Johnson Space Center. Cintron also served from (1979–85) as the project scientist for the Space Lab 2 mission which was launched aboard the Space Shuttle Challenger in 1985. Among the positions held by Cintron in NASA are "Chief of the Biomedical Operations and Research Branch in the Medical Science Division" and "Director for managing the Life Sciences Research Laboratories" in support of medical operations. In 2004 she was named "Chief of NASA's (JSC) Space Medicine and Health Care Systems Office", position which she currently holds.

In 1978, Dr. Cintron became the first person of Puerto Rican heritage to become a finalist of the NASA Astronaut Selection Program.

NASA Awards and Recognitions:

"JSC Director's Commendation and Innovation Award", the centers highest award for a civil servant, the "NASA Medal for Exceptional Scientific Achievement", the highest science honor given by the agency. On October 7, 2004, she was inducted into the Hispanic Engineer's National Achievement Awards Conference (HENAAC) Hall of Fame. The Hall of Fame, located in Los Angeles, California, was established in 1998 and recognizes the contributions of Hispanics in the fields of science, engineering and technology. In 2006, she was recognized as one of the 100 most influential Hispanics in the United States by Hispanic magazine.

== Gilberto Colón ==
Chemical Engineer, Aero-Space Technologist

Associate Director for the Sun Earth Connections Programs

Colon is the director of the NASA program known as "Living with a Star/Solar Terrestrial Probes". He travels throughout the United States and Puerto Rico during the summers, instructing teachers of both private and public educational facilities.

NASA Goddard Space Flight Center in Maryland

== Juan R. Cruz ==
Aerospace Engineer, Aero Space Technologist

"Mars Exploration Rover (MER) Parachute" at NASA Langley Research Center in Hampton, Virginia.

Cruz is a senior aerospace engineer in the Exploration Systems Engineering Branch at the NASA Langley Research Center. His responsibilities are focused on research and development of entry, descent, and landing (EDL) systems for robotic and human exploration missions. He was a member of the highly successful Mars Exploration Rover (MER) project that placed two rovers on the surface of Mars in 2004. His contributions to the MER project were centered on the design and qualification of the supersonic parachute.

Cruz is also a member of the Phoenix (Mars 2007), Mars Science Laboratory (Mars 2009), and Crew Exploration Vehicle EDL teams. He has undertaken research on advanced missions to Mars, including robotic airplanes, as well as having been a technical reviewer for the Genesis, Huygens, and Stardust missions. Prior to his involvement with exploration programs he conducted research on high-altitude unmanned aircraft.

Cruz holds a Ph.D. from Virginia Tech, and an S.B. from MIT, both in aerospace engineering. During his years at MIT he was involved with the Monarch and Daedalus human powered airplane teams.

== Carlos Del Castillo ==
"Program Scientist for the Ocean Biology and Biogeochemistry Program"

"NASA Headquarters, in Washington, D.C."

Del Castillo is the recipient of the Presidential Early Career Award for Scientists and Engineers (PECASE) award, the highest honor bestowed by the United States government on scientists and engineers beginning their independent careers.

He began working in the Mississippi River plume and in the application of remote sensors to study coastal environments. Del Castillo co-edited with Drs. Richard Miller and Brent McKee, "Remote Sensing of the Coastal Environment," a book which provides extensive insight on remote sensing of coastal waters from aircraft and space-based platforms

== Lydia Del Rio ==
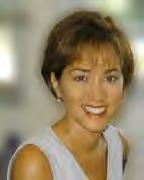
Lydia Del Rio

Analyst

"Research and Program Management and Center Full Cost Program Analyst" at NASA Kennedy Space Center in Florida.

Del Rio is responsible for planning and managing R&PM and for evaluating the effectiveness of its program efforts, and for the allocation of resources and funds utilization.

== Rey N. Diaz ==
Engineering Management

Stationed at NASA Kennedy Space Flight Center in Florida, Dr. Rey N. Diaz is a senior manager serving as the Chief of the Business Systems Division at the Kennedy Space Center. Diaz holds a Ph.D. in Industrial Engineering and a master's degree in Engineering Management both from the University of Central Florida. Prior to joining NASA in 1983, Diaz earned his B.S. degree in electrical engineering from the University of Puerto Rico, Mayagüez Campus.

For over 40 missions, Dr. Diaz was instrumental in the integration and testing of space flight systems and instruments carried on board Space Shuttle missions. In 1991, Diaz received the Silver Snoopy Award - one of the highest and most prestigious honors bestowed by the NASA's Astronaut Office and flown aboard a Space Shuttle mission, and the NASA Management award in 2017 for sustained and outstanding performance and contributions to the NASA Spaceflight programs

Dr. Diaz, an expert in management systems, has provided guidance and services to institutions and organizations. He led the implementation of the Business Management System for all NASA employees at the Kennedy Space Center.

Dr. Diaz has been recognized for his contributions to increase awareness toward careers in Science, Technology, Math and Science and the impact of science and technology on society.

== Alfonso Eaton ==
Mechanical Engineer, Aero-Space Technologist

Assistant Director of the Engineering Division of the Goddard Space Flight Center.

"In 1966, Eaton became the first Puerto Rican and graduate of the Mayagüez Campus of the University of Puerto Rico to work for NASA. Eaton retired in September 2005, after 39 years of service to the Space agency."

NASA Awards and Recognitions:

2000-NASA Medal for exceptional service, 200-NASA Medal for extraordinary service.

== Enectalí Figueroa-Feliciano ==
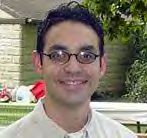
Enectalí Figueroa

Mechanical Engineer, Astronaut applicant

An astrophysicist at Goddard Space Flight Center in Maryland, Figueroa's research interests revolve around the development of high-energy-resolution imaging spectrometers for space-borne applications in experimental astrophysics and cosmology."

"Figueroa is an astrophysicist who pioneered the development position-sensitive detectors and is an expert and researcher on dark matter. Figueroa is a researcher with the National Aeronautics and Space Administration (NASA) and a professor of physics MIT.

Figueroa is also an Assistant Professor of Physics at the Massachusetts Institute of Technology {MIT] and the author of various papers including "Position-sensitive low-temperature detectors". astrophysicist at the National Aeronautics and Space Administration (NASA)

== Orlando Figueroa ==
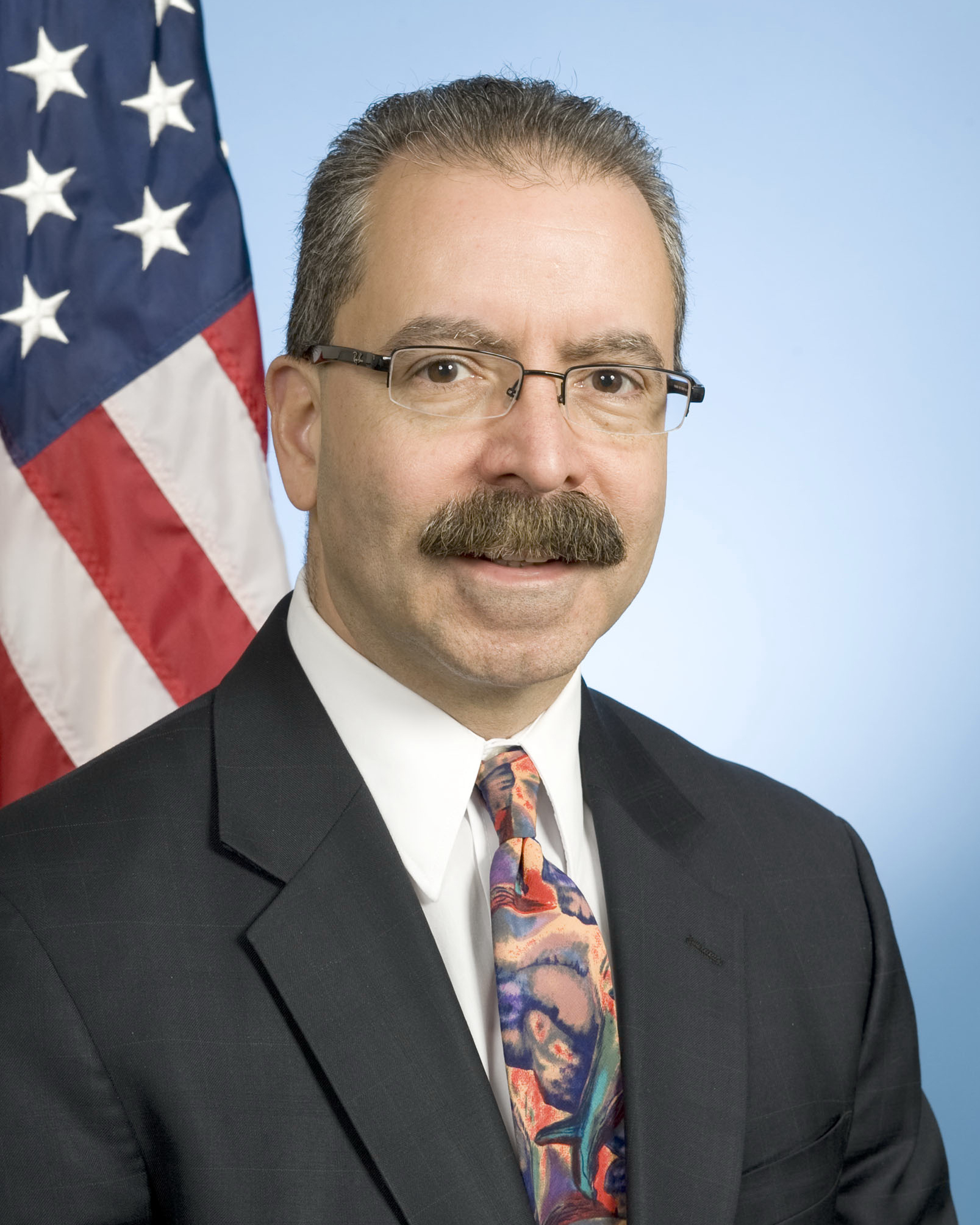
Orlando Figueroa

External videos
- You may watch and listen to Orlando Figueroa recipient of the 2005 Service to America Medal here

Mechanical Engineer, Aero-Space Technologist

Former "Director of Solar System Exploration Division and Mars Exploration" and "Director, Applied Engineering & Technology" (as the "Director of Engineering" he managed the full scope of engineering activities at Goddard) at Goddard Space Flight Center in Maryland.

Headed the cryogenic technology section, played a key role on the Cosmic Background Explorer mission, and managed a Space Shuttle Helium on Orbit Mission. Manager for the Small Explorers (SMEX) project, manager for the Explorers Program, and Director of Systems Technology and Advanced Concept Directorate. On August 1, 2004, was named Deputy Associate Administrator for Programs. In August 2005, Figueroa was appointed to the position of Director for System Safety and Mission Assurance at the Goddard Space Flight Center. In October 2005, Figueroa was named Director of Applied Engineering and Technology at Goddard, as such he is responsible for 1,300 employees and provides guidance on engineering and system technology.

NASA Awards and Recognitions:

1993-NASA Outstanding Leadership Medal for SMEX, 1994-Community Stars Award, 2001-Presidential Rank Award for Outstanding Performance as a Senior Executive, 2002-Pioneer Award, 2002-Hispanic Business magazine named Fiqueroa to its list of the nation's 100 Most Influential Hispanics.

== Guillermo A. Gonzalez ==
Electronical Engineer, Aero-Space Technologist

"In Space Propulsion-Solar Sails Program Manager"

Specialty: Electropyrotechnics Firing circuit & Nickel Cadmium Battery Systems at Langley Research Center in Hampton, Virginia.

NASA Group/Team Achievement Awards:

1989, 90-Group Achievement Award as member of the HALOE Instrument Team, 1990-Group Achievement Award as member of the X-29 Drop Model Team, 1994-Team Excellence Award for the X-31 Drop Model Program. Co-authored 3 publications in the area of aircraft flight testing.

== Olga D. Gonzalez-Sanabria ==
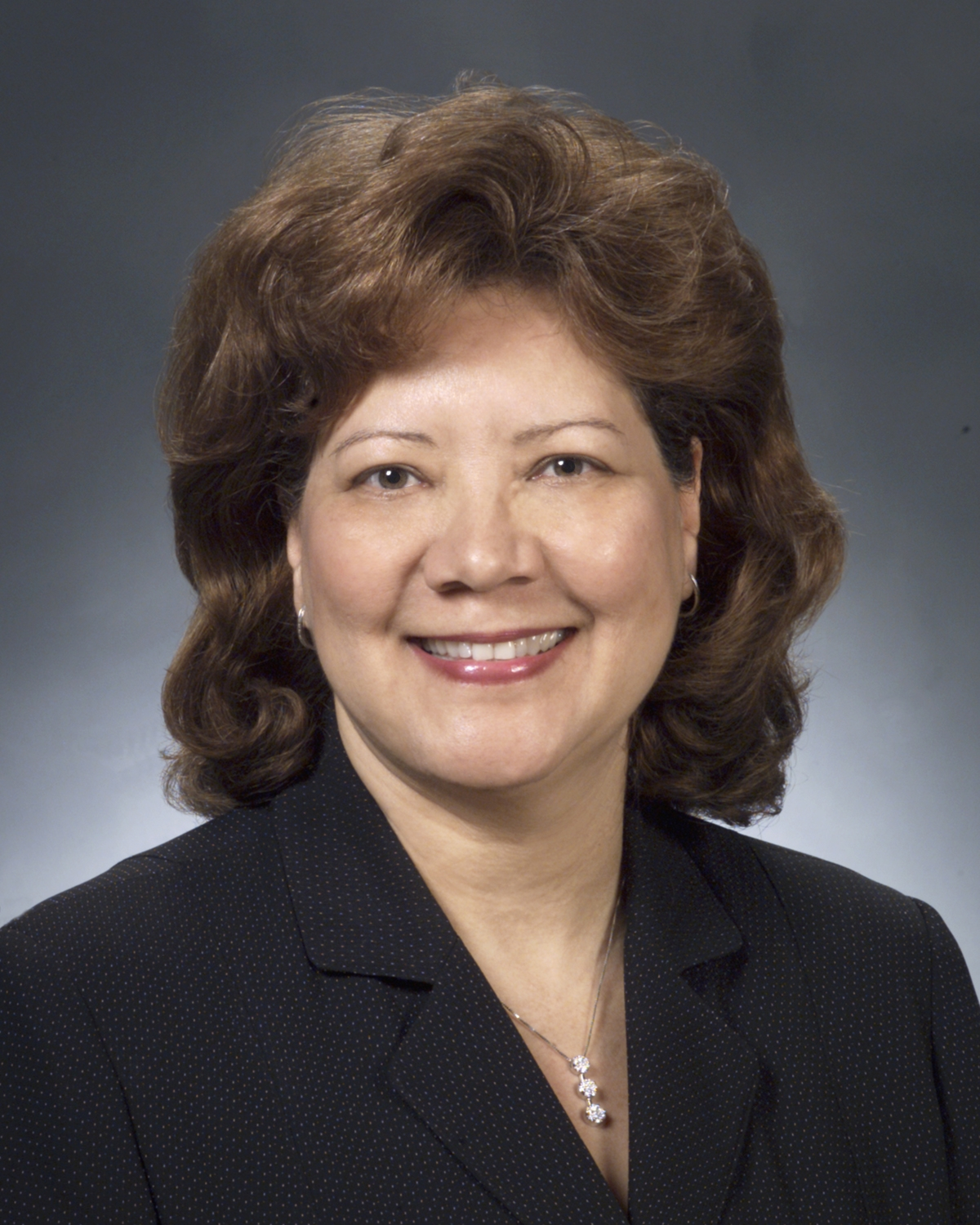
Olga D. Gonzalez-Sanabria

Chemical Engineer, Aero-Space Technologist

"Director of the Engineering and Technical Services"

Gonzalez-Sanabria is responsible for planning, and directing a full range of integrated services including engineering, fabrication, testing, facility management and aircraft services for the Glenn Research Center.

NASA Awards and Recognitions:

1993-NASA Exceptional Service Medal, 2002-NASA Medal for Outstanding Leadership, 2004-Inducted to the Ohio Women Hall of Fame.

NASA Glenn Research Center in Ohio

== Amri Hernandez-Pellerano ==
Electronics Engineer, Aero-Space Technologist

"Power Systems Electronics Designer" at Goddard Space Flight Center in Maryland.

Hernandez-Pellerano designs, builds and tests the electronics that will regulate the solar array power in order to charge the spacecraft battery and distribute power to the different loads or users inside the spacecraft.

NASA Awards and Recognitions:

2003-The GSFC Engineering Achievement Award for her design of the Power Systems Electronics for the MAP mission.

== Gloria Hernandez ==
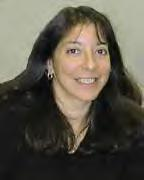
Gloria Hernandez

Physical Scientist, Science Manager, Stratospheric Aerosol and Gas Experiment III on the International Space Station (SAGE III on ISS)

NASA Awards and Recognitions:

Over 30 NASA Performance Awards and Superior Accomplishment Awards

2011 - Official Citation from the General Assembly, State of Connecticut in recognition for receiving the 2011 Latina Legends Award in Science and Technology from the Latinas & Power Symposium, and for her commitment to the empowerment of women and breaking through barriers in science and technology.

2001 - Recipient of the NASA Fellowship to Harvard Business School.

2000 - Southern Illinois University Minority Engineering Program Achievement Award.

1998 - The National Technical Association 50 Top Women in the Sciences Award.

== Annie Delgado-Holton ==
Project Control Specialist

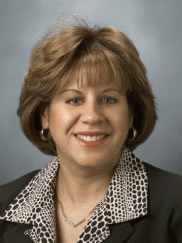
Annie Delgado-Holton

As a PCG Delgado-Holton us responsible for the budget planning and analysis of a major portion of a program and or project for which she was selected. She provides support to the Exploration Systems Division (ESD) as member of the Project Control Office staff. Delgado-Holton evaluates financial trends and determines compliance with project guidance at Glenn Research Center in Ohio.

Delgado-Holton launched the first "Esperanza Community Dialogue", Esperanza is a non-profit organization in the Cleveland area, whose main goal is to provide students with the necessary resources to excel in their college careers. Esperanza Community Dialogue brings forth to the Center Esperanza scholarship recipients and their parents to learn and discuss the great opportunities offered at NASA GRC.

Delgado-Holton began her career at NASA Glenn Research Center as an Executive Support Assistant to the Aeronautics Directorate.

She is also a member of LATINA and as a member she advocated for the inclusion of a Hispanic woman into the Ohio's Women's Hall of Fame.

== Lucas G. Horta ==
Aerospace Engineer, Aero-Space Technologist

NASA Awards and Recognitions:

1990-Certificate of Appreciation (Outstanding Accomplishments Control-Structure Interaction Program), 1987, 89, 94, 96-Certificate of Outstanding Performance, 1990-Group Achievement Award (Control-Structure Interaction Mini-Mast Team), 1990-92-Superior Accomplishment Award, 1996-Performance Award.

He is the author and or co-author of over 35 technical papers in the areas of system identification, vibration control and isolation, optimal control design and implementation, optimal actuator/sensor placement, model testing, and experimental verification of control methodologies.

NASA Langley Research Center in Hampton, Virginia

== Grisselle LaFontaine ==
Information Technologist

"Information Technology (IT) Specialist" at Glenn Research Center in Ohio.

Part of LaFontaine's job is to assist in the implementation of federal IT mandates. She develops Web-based solutions to address information management needs. LaFontaine developed a dynamic web-based bulletin board called "Today@Glenn" and she created a web site documenting Cultural Change initiatives at Glenn. LaFontaine helped develop a NASA strategic plan for the advancement of Hispanics at the center.

== Javier Lecha ==
Electronics Engineer, Aero-Space Technologist

"Group Leader in the area of Electromechanical systems" at Goddard Space Center in Maryland.

== María C. Lecha ==
Electronics Engineer, Aero-Space Technologist

Lecha is in charge of a group of engineers who are in the process of developing the "Solar Dynamic Observatory" which will be launched into outer space in 2008 at Goddard Space Center in Maryland

== Carlos A. Liceaga, P.E. ==
Electrical and Computer Engineer, Aero-Space Technologist

"Explorer Acquisition Manager" at Langley Research Center in Hampton, Virginia.

For the Explorer Program, leads the development of proposal guidelines; and the technical, management, and cost evaluation of the proposals.

Specialties: Fault-Tolerant Computing, Reliability Modeling

NASA Awards:

2003, 06-Time-Off Award; 1995, 2003, 04, 05-Performance Award; 2002-For A Special Task Award; 1999, 2000, 01-Superior Accomplishment Award; 1998-Certificate of Recognition for Invention Disclosure; 1986-Special Achievement Award.

He is the author and or co-author of 12 publications in the areas of reliability modeling, fault-tolerant computers, space systems, spacecraft simulation, Shuttle/Station subsystems, and space mission proposal guidelines.

== Carlos Ortiz Longo ==
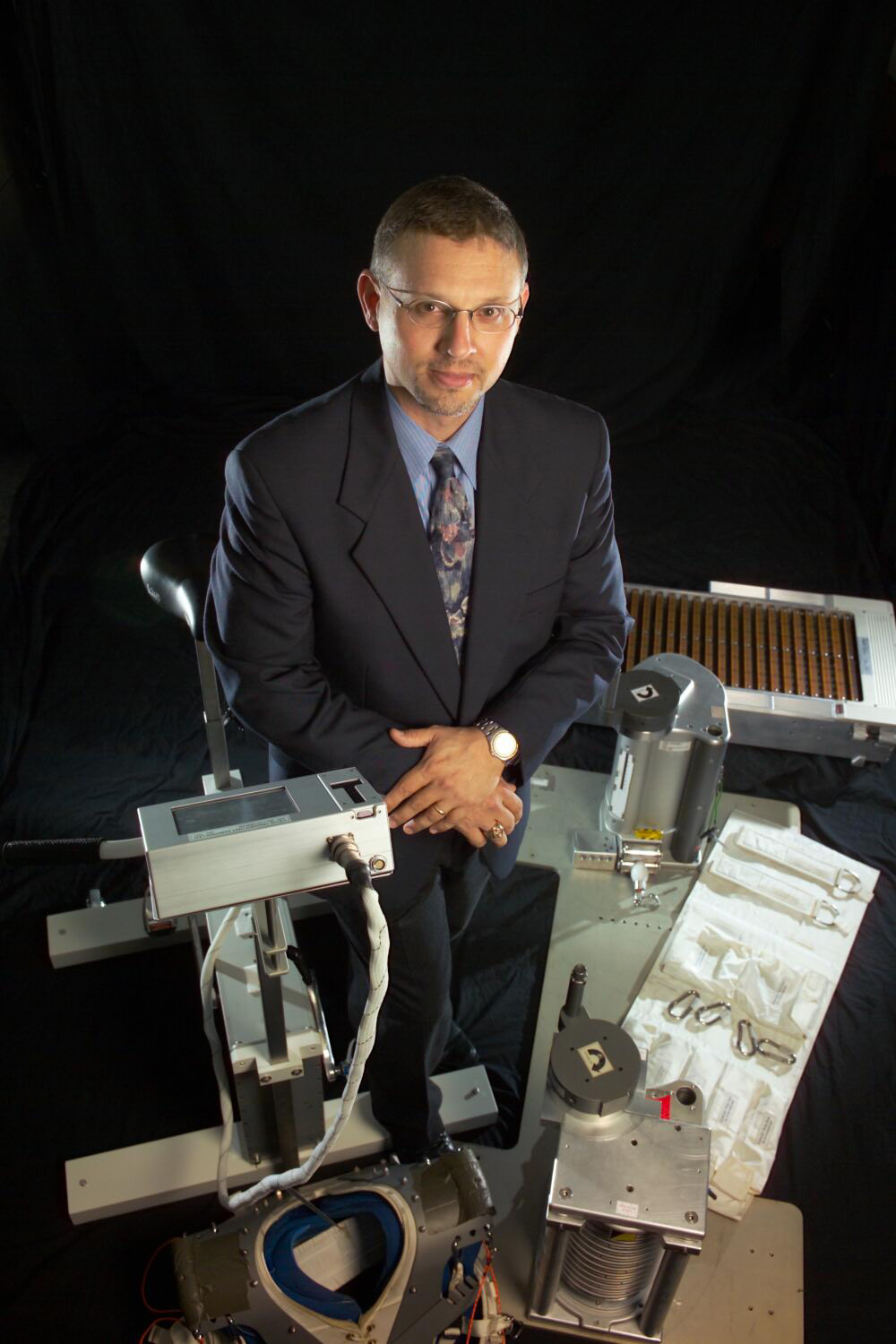
Carlos Ortiz-Longo

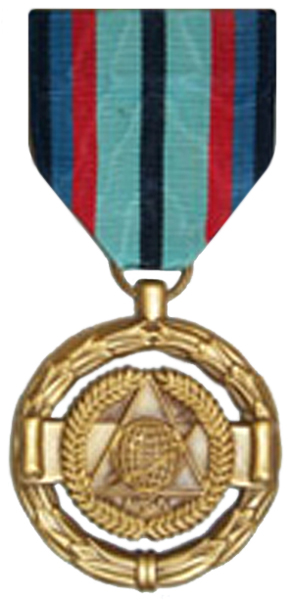
NASA Exceptional Achievement Medal

Mechanical Engineering, Materials Science and Engineering, Air Transport Pilot, and Flight Instructor.

Dr. Carlos R. Ortiz Longo is a retired NASA Johnson Space Center Engineer, and pilot. His expertise includes Thermal Analysis, Thermal Design, High Speed Atmospheric Thermal Protection Systems, Materials Engineering, Mechanical Behavior of High Temperature Structural Ceramics, Mechanical Testing of Materials, Structural Mechanics, Astronaut Crew Health Care Systems, Rocket Engine Testing, Project Management, and System Management. Dr. Ortiz Longo is a certified an Air Transport Pilot, and is currently flying for a major airline. He is certified to fly the Boeing 737, 767, and 777

Dr. Ortiz Longo reached finalist status in the Astronaut Selection program (top 4% of qualified applicants who are invited to the Johnson Space Center in Houston for final interviews), for Astronaut Candidate Class 16 in 1996.

In 2005, Ortiz Longo was awarded the NASA Exceptional Achievement Medal. To be awarded the medal, a NASA employee must make substantial contributions characterized by a substantial and significant improvement in operations, efficiency, service, financial savings, science, or technology which directly contribute to the mission of NASA For civilians, the decoration is typically bestowed to mid-level and senior NASA administrators who have supervised at least four to five successful NASA missions. Astronauts may be awarded the decoration after two to three space flights.

Among his awards, recognitions, and achievements are:

- Silver Snoopy Award, 1991
- Finalist, Astronaut Selection Program, Astronaut Candidate Class 16, 1996
- NASA Exceptional Achievement Medal, 2005
- Graduate of the NASA Leadership Development Program, 2009

== Debbie Martinez ==
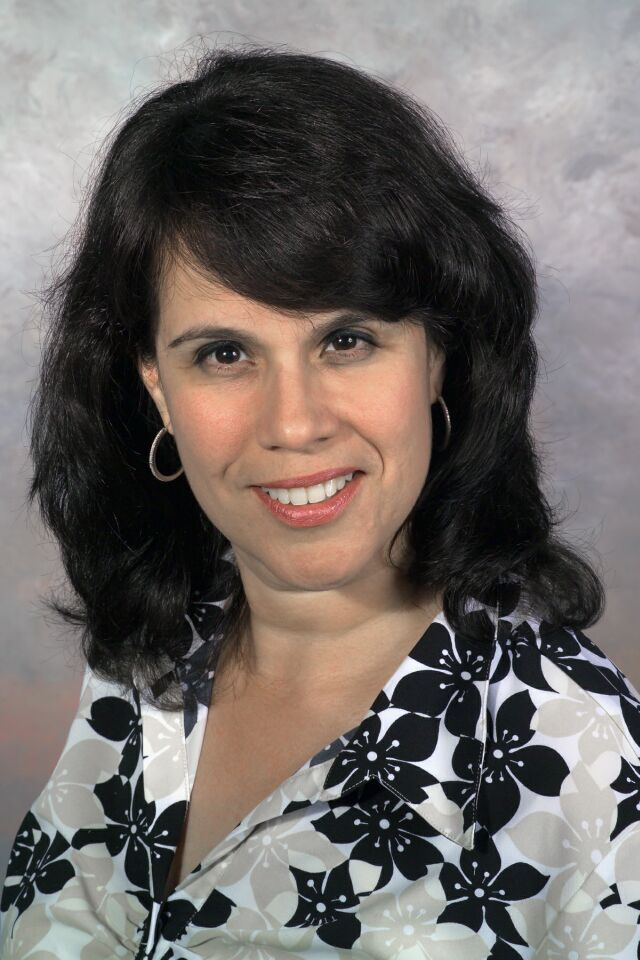
Debbie Martinez

Computer Engineer, Aero-Space Technologist

"Expertise: Flight Simulation" at Langley Research Center in Hampton, Virginia

"Flight Systems and Software Branch" Software manager for the new Cockpit Motion Facility. Martinez's job consists of supporting La RC (Langley Research Center) researcher community with their particular flight research project studies utilizing the La RC simulation facilities. This involves understanding their problem domain, formulating possible solutions, allocating appropriate resources, and ensuring that the results satisfy their researcher's needs.

NASA Superior Awards:

1999-Outstanding performance and contributions to the FWP (Outstanding FWPC Representative), 1999-Outstanding efforts in overseeing the final HSR simulation study at LaRC, 2001-Support of LaRC OEOP, 2001-2003-CMF DC6 Leadership. Plus numerous NASA Performance, NASA Team Excellence and NASA Group Awards. 1999-"Latina of the Year Award in Science and Technology" by "Latina" magazine.

== Lissette Martinez ==
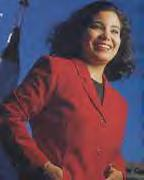
Lissette Martinez

Electrical Engineer, Rocket Scientist

Martinez is the lead electrical engineer for the Space Experiment Module program at the Wallops Flight Facility which is part of NASA's Goddard Flight Facility.

She is responsible for providing electrical engineering support to Code 870 Space Experiment Module (SEM) program. She also is responsible for the testing of ground and flight hardware. Martinez works with students around the world, helping them with science experiments that will actually ride along on Space Shuttle missions and blast into space.

Martinez was part of the team that launched a rocket from White Sands, New Mexico to gather information on the Hale-Bopp Comet in 1999. She was featured in the November 2002 issue of Latina magazine.

== Lourdes E. Miranda ==
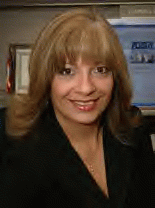
Lourdes E. Miranda

Senior Program Analyst

Miranda co-manages the NASA Sponsored Research and Education Support Services Contract (SRESS). These services include support to the process for soliciting and selecting research investigations for NASA funding; logistical support to workshops and conferences for sponsored research and education; and maintenance of an interactive internet site and electronic database that allow for submission and storage of proposals and associated documentation.

NASA Awards and Recognitions:

2005-she was awarded the NASA Acquisition Improvement Award (AIA) the highest agency acquisition award; recognitions from EPA, CSC, government of Puerto Rico, the University of Puerto Rico, and from the Hispanic community in Washington, D.C.. she was also featured in "Tiempo Latino - Washington Post".

NASA Headquarters located in Washington, D.C.

== Mayra N. Montrosa ==
Executive Officer for the NASA Chief Scientist

Montrosa is responsible for coordinating Science Policy at the Agency at Headquarters located in Washington, D.C. She works with representatives from the NASA research organizations to ensure that the NASA Science Policy is implemented as intended. She is also in charge of developing the NASA implementation to the Federal Policy on Research Misconduct. She works to ensure communication within the Agency research programs and between NASA other Federal Agencies.

== Marla E. Perez-Davis ==
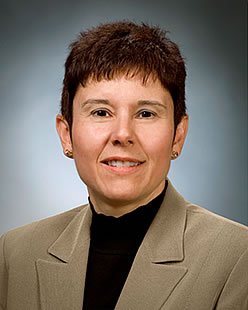
Marla E. Perez-Davis.

Chemical Engineer, Aero-Space Technologist

=== Positions held ===
- Director of NASA's John H. Glenn Research Center (Cleveland, OH) (2016-date)
- Deputy Director of NASA's Glenn Research Center (Cleveland, OH) (2014–2016)
- Director of the Aeronautics Research Office at NASA's Glenn Research Center (Cleveland, OH) (2010–2014)
- "Chief Electrochemistry Branch" at Glenn Research Center in Ohio.

=== NASA Awards and Other Recognitions ===
- NASA Outstanding Leadership Medal
- Presidential Rank Award for Meritorious Executives
- 2015 Crain's Women of Note
- Top 25 Elite Business Women - Hispanic Business Magazine
- Women of Color Career Achievement
- Distinguished Alumni Award, Alumni Association of University of Puerto Rico Mayaguez
- Women in Aerospace Award for Aerospace Awareness
- Women of Color Technology Award for Career Achievement (2001)
- Hispanic Engineer National Achievement Santiago Rodriguez Diversity Award (2001)
- certified NASA Lean Six Sigma Black Belt

Marla E. Perez-Davis holds a PhD in chemical engineering.

== Mercedes Reaves ==
Mechanical Engineer, Aero-Space Technologist

"Research Engineer" at Langley Research Center in West Virginia

Reaves is responsible for the design of a viable full-scale solar sail and the development and testing of a scale model solar sail. She is also responsible for planning experimental studies to validate analytical techniques and study solar sails dynamics.

== Shayla Rivera ==
Aerospace Engineer

Rivera worked at NASA on the Space Shuttle and International Space Station programs at the Johnson Space Center in Houston, Texas. She left NASA, after working there for 8 years, on account that she wasn't allowed to place a St. Christopher medallion on the Space Shuttle dash board. Rivera discovered that she had a hidden talent as a comedian and used her experiences to create the hit one-woman show "Rocket Science and Salsa," In 2004, Rivera received the "Mario Moreno Cantinflas Award" presented by the city of Los Angeles in recognition of entertainers who "represent the Latino Community with the same humor as the great Cantinflas did" and for her involvement in the community.

== Miriam Rodon-Naveira ==
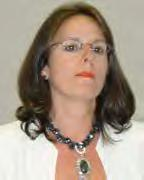
Miriam Rodon-Naveira

Biology-Aquatic Microbial Ecologist

"Senior Physical Sciences Technical Manager" at Dryden Flight Research Center located in California

Rodon-Naveria is responsible for developing, coordinating and maintaining research and educational activities in support of NASA DFRC mission.

In 1995, she became the first woman minority Branch Chief within the National Exposure Research Laboratory. In 1998, she became the first Hispanic woman to hold the Deputy Directorship for the Environmental Sciences Division within the NERL. Miriam Rodon-Naveria holds a PhD in Biology Aquatic Microbial Ecology.

== Miguel Rodríguez ==
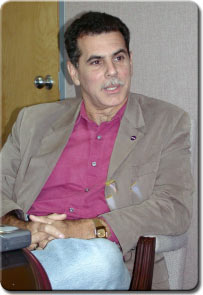
Miguel Rodríguez

Mechanical Engineer

"Chief of the Integration Office of the Cape Canaveral Spaceport Management Office"

Rodríguez is responsible for overall integration of CCSMO functions including assuring the effective base operations, maintenance, sustaining engineering, support services for all NASA at Kennedy Space Center (KSC), 49th Space Wing at Cape Canaveral Air Base Station and Patrick Air Force Base which is provided through the Joint Base Operations and Support Contract.

NASA Awards and Recognitions:

Two NASA Exceptional Medals, KSC Leadership Award and the NASA Silver Snoopy Award.

== Otilia I. Rodriguez-Alvarez ==
Electrical Engineer, Aero-Space Technologist "Solar B Mission Manager/Geospace Instrument Systems Manager" at Goddard Space Flight Center in Maryland

Ms. Rodriguez-Alvarez began her career with NASA in 1986 at the Goddard Space Flight Center, Greenbelt, Maryland, where she served as a test engineer with the Space Simulation Test Engineering Section. She then transferred to the Guidance, Navigation, and Control Branch, where she worked on solar array and antenna systems for the Tropical Rainfall Measuring Mission (TRMM) and the X-Ray Timing Explorer (XTE). She later became the lead engineer for the Sensors and Actuators Team on the Microwave Anisotropy Probe (MAP).

After leaving the Engineering Directorate, she became the Instrument Manager for the Advance Baseline Imager for the Geostationary Operational Environmental Satellite (GOES) Program. Currently she is the Solar B Mission Manager and the Geospace Instrument Systems Manager in the Sun Earth Connection Office.

Otilia received her B.S. degree in electrical engineering from the University of Puerto Rico, Mayagüez Campus, and her M.S. in electrical engineering from the George Washington University, Washington, D.C.

== Pedro Rodriguez ==
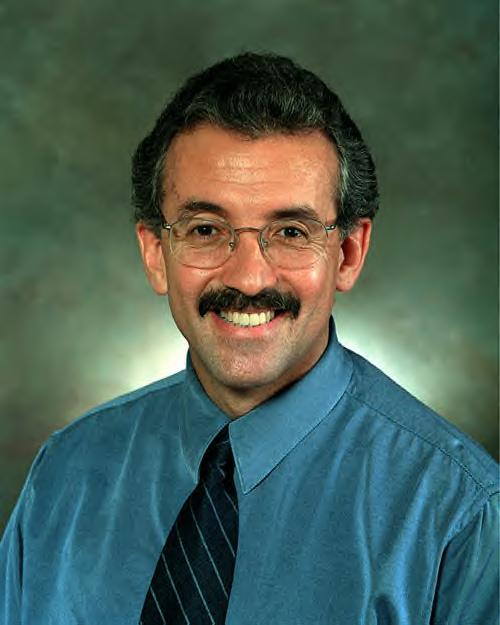
Pedro Rodriguez

Mechanical Engineer, Aero-Space Technologist

"Director of the test Laboratory in the Engineering Directorate at NASA's Marshall Space Flight Center" at Marshall Space Flight Center in Alabama.

Rodriguez is responsible for the engineering services and facilities for in environmental structural and propulsion testing of NASA programs assigned to the Marshall Space Flight Center. Among his duties are research, development, qualification and acceptance testing of critical space and flight hardware, as well as the testing of relevant development hardware.

Rodriguez invented a portable, battery operated seat lift designed for people with degenerative knee arthritis to enable them to stand more easily.

NASA Awards and Recognitions:

NASA Exceptional Service Medal, NASA Inventors Award, The Silver Snoopy Award, The Marshall Center Directors Commendation Award as the "Outstanding Hispanic Employee". The Puerto Rican Senate recognized Rodriguez with a resolution marking his engineering achievement.

Pedro Rodriguez holds a PhD in mechanical engineering.

Rodriguez is the son of the late Puerto Rican salsa singer Pellin Rodríguez.

== Miguel Roman ==
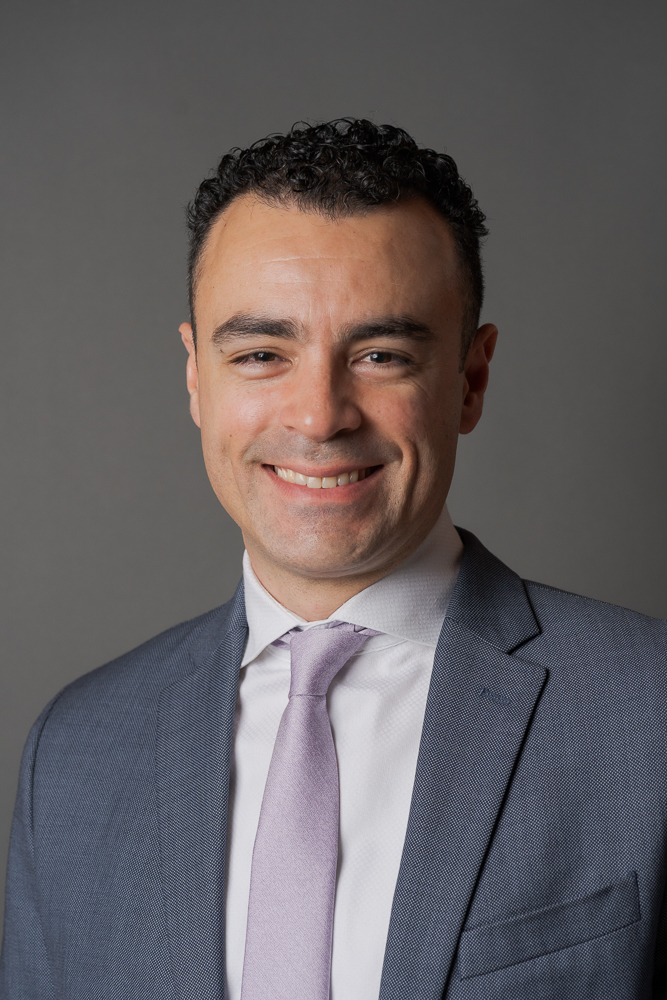
Miguel O. Roman

Earth System Scientist

External videos
- You may watch and listen to Miguel Román describe his work at NASA here

Miguel Román, is the deputy director for atmospheres in the Earth Sciences Division at NASA's Goddard Space Flight Center, an organization dedicated to advancing our understanding of the Earth's atmospheric processes, including mesoscale meteorology, precipitation, atmospheric chemistry, aerosols and clouds, radiative transfer, and related climate studies.

A leading expert in the fields of satellite remote sensing, climate change, disaster risk reduction, and sustainability, Román has championed translational research and data-intensive approaches to assess and address climate-related risks. His work is internationally recognized for shedding light on the disproportionate hardships experienced by socially-vulnerable and underserved communities following major disasters.

In 2022, Román was named the team leader of the Moderate Resolution Imaging Spectroradiometer (MODIS) science team for NASA's Terra and Aqua missions, a key flagship of the Earth Observing System (EOS). Román also serves as the land discipline leader for the Suomi-NPP and NOAA-20 Visible Infrared Imaging Radiometer Suite (VIIRS) science team, a worldwide group of investigators and technical staff in charge of one of the largest and most comprehensive polar-orbiting satellite systems operated by NASA and NOAA to monitor our planet's vital signs. He also spearheaded the development of NASA's Black Marble product suite, pioneering the first quantitative measurements of nocturnal visible and near-infrared imagery to meet the diverse needs of Earth science research and applications communities. This innovation has enabled critical analysis of urbanization, disaster response, and understanding humanity's impact on the planet.

In 2016, Dr. Román was recognized by President Barack Obama with the Presidential Early Career Award for Scientists and Engineers (PECASE), the highest honor bestowed by the United States government on scientists and engineers beginning their independent careers. He is also a 2014 Service to America Medal Samuel J. Heyman Service to America Medals finalist, one of the highest honors for federal civil servants.

A native of San Juan, Puerto Rico, Dr. Román holds a bachelor's degree in electrical engineering from the University of Puerto Rico at Mayagüez, a master's degree in systems engineering from Cornell University, and a Ph.D. in geography from Boston University.

== Monserrate Roman ==
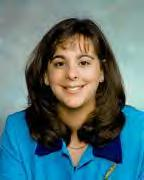
Monserrate Roman

"Chief Microbiologist" Micro-Biologist at Marshall Flight Space Center in Alabama.

Roman is the Chief Microbiologist for the Environmental Control and Life Support System project. She determines how microbes will behave under different situations and in different locations, such as the nooks and crannies of the Space Station.

She ensures safe water and air for the crew of the International Space Station.

== Carlos A. Gómez Rosa ==
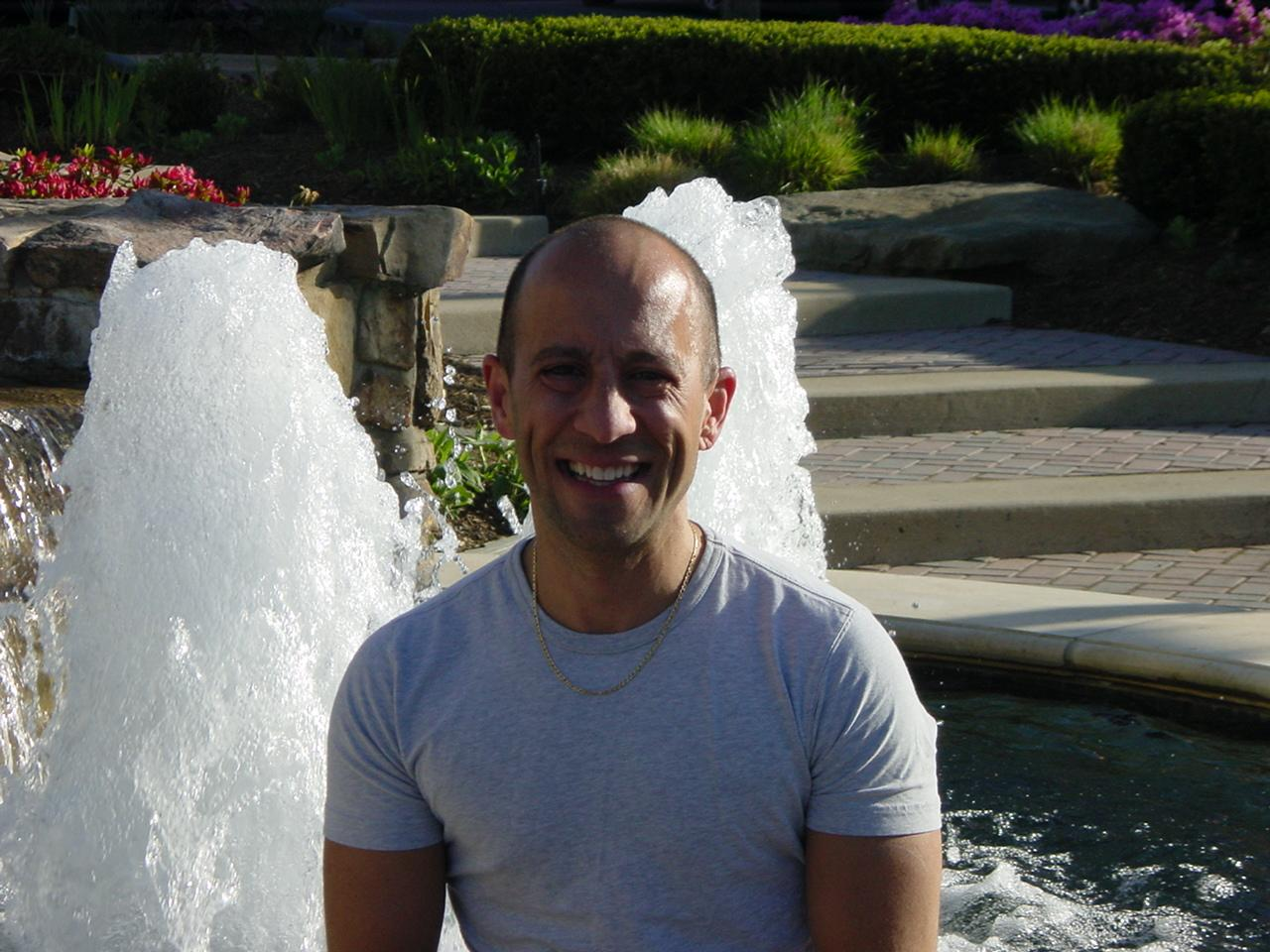
Carlos A. Gomez-Rosa

Mission Director/Ground System Manager

2020–Present; GeoCarb Project: Ground System Manager

2016–2018; Landsat 9 Project: mission operations readiness manager (MORM)/NASA ground system lead

2011–2016; Mars Atmosphere & Volatile EvolutioN (MAVEN) Mission: ground system manager and mission director and mission ops contracting officer rep. Responsible for the operations of the NASA MAVEN mission as an end-to-end system to ensure that the spacecraft, the instruments, and ground systems are healthy and that the science is processed and delivered to the scientists on the mission. Answer to the MAVEN primary investigator and the project manager. Work with the Spacecraft Operations Team (SCT) and also with all of the mission interfaces, including the Navigation Team (NAV), the Science Operations Center (SOC), Instrument Teams, and the Deep Space Network (DSN).

2009–2011; 2009–2011; deputy then lead systems engineer of the GOES-R Ground System Project at Goddard Space Flight Center in Maryland

2007–2009; mission operations manager - GOES-O Project

2005–2007; program director of the EDOS Project

Awards:

- 2017 Honor Award and Group Achievement Award: MAVEN-Mars Science Laboratory Curiosity-Mars Exploration Rover Curiosity: Relay Test Team
- 2016 NASA Exceptional Achievement Medal
- 2015 NASA Robert H. Goddard Exceptional Achievement for Engineering
- Honor Award and Group Achievement Award: The MAVEN Team
- 2007 Engineering Excellence Award: NASA-GSFC Information Systems Division for outstanding leadership and exemplary systems engineering support to the EOS Project.

Originally from Carolina, Carlos attended Colegio Baustista, Escuela Antonia Saez, and Escuela Superior Berwind (Berwind High School). Gomez-Rosa has a degree in electrical engineering (magna cum laude) from the University Of Puerto Rico/Mayaguez Campus and a Master of Science in electrical engineering from The Johns Hopkins University in Baltimore. Carlos is now in his 33th year at NASA.

== Yajaira Sierra Sastre ==
External videos
- You may watch and listen to Dr. Yajaira Sierra Sastre during an interview here

"PhD in nanotechnology from Cornell University", Astronaut applicant

Sierra Sastre was chosen to take part in a new NASA project, called "HI-SEAS," an acronym for "Hawaii Space Exploration Analog and Simulation," that will help to determine why astronauts don't eat enough, having noted that they get bored with spaceship food and end up with problems like weight loss and lethargy that put their health at risk. She lived for four months (March 2013 - August 2013) isolated in a planetary module, which simulated what life will be like for astronauts at a future base on Mars at a base, in Hawaii. According to Sierra Sastre part of the food study will include an attempt to control the exposure to fresh air, evaluate how their senses of smell and taste change over time in isolation, and find out what role food plays in the crew's spirits and state of mind. Sierra Sastre is an aspiring astronaut.

== Desiree Santa ==
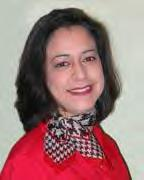
Desiree Santa

Administrator

"Congressional Liaison/Research Opportunity Administrator" at Headquarters located in Washington, D.C.

Management Analyst in the Office of Earth, performing analytical and evaluative work related to the management, organizational efficiency and productivity of program operations.

== Juan A. Román Velázquez ==
Mechanical Engineer, Aero-Space Technologist

"Space projects formulation Manager" at Goddard Space Center in Maryland.

Román Velázquez is in charge of a group of scientists and engineers who are the developers of the advanced concepts used in the Space missions and whose technologies are to be used in telescopes and interferometry missions.

== Felix Soto Toro ==
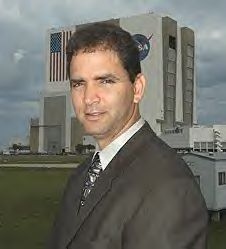
Felix Soto Toro

Astronaut applicant, Electrical Designs Engineer at Kennedy Space Center in Florida.

Soto reviews, designs, builds, tests and implements engineering designs used in the Space Shuttle and Payload Operations Development Laboratories. The main project he developed was the Advanced Payload Transfer Measurement System (ASPTMS)(Electronic 3D measuring system), which consists of a simplified, robust, centrally operated and portable system that automatically measures the spherical coordinates offset between the trunnion and their supports during transfer operations.

NASA Awards and Recognitions:

Soto Toro was presented with the 2003 "El Premio Coqui" by La Casa de Puerto Rico in Florida, for his outstanding contributions in the field of science. On November 9, of that same year, Soto Toro along with another Puerto Rican Astronaut applicant, Henry Bursian Berríos and Ninfa Segarra, who was the first Hispanic Deputy Mayor of New York City, were named the Grand Marshalls of the Puerto Rican Day Parade held in Palm Bay, Florida.

== Adolfo Figueroa-Viñas ==
Astrophysicist

Figueroa-Viñas is an Astrophysicist of the Physics Extraterrestrial Laboratory at the Goddard Space Center.

Figueroa-Viñas is the first Puerto Rican astrophysicist at NASA working in solar plasma physics. As a senior research scientist he is involved in many NASA missions such as Wind, SOHO, Cluster and MMS projects in which he is the author and co-author of numerous scientific papers in his field. Figueroa-Viñas has served as Guest Co-Investigator of the International Sun Earth Explorer (ISEE-1) mission and the Voyagers program. He is currently a Co-Investigator in the WIND/SWE experiment of the International Solar Terrestrial Program (ISTP) and the Space Physics Theory Program grant entitled The Role of Turbulence in Heliospheric Plasmas. Figueroa-Viñas has participated in the organizing committee of "La Conferencia Espacial de las Américas" held in Costa Rica, Chile and Uruguay. He is the recipient of the NASA Special Service Award.

== NASA's Bonzzo Award ==
Charles Scales, Art Stephenson, and John Rivas with NASA's BONZZO Award

John Rivas from Aibonito, Puerto Rico and creator of the comic strip "Bonzzo", designed some special "Bonzzo" strips commemorating NASA's achievements, including "Beyond the Moon", a calendar of the year 2000 honoring Hispanic heritage. NASA also instated the Bonzzo Award, a pint-size Bonzzo statue that will be given annually to the individual who makes the biggest contribution to NASA's Hispanic program.

== See also ==
- List of Puerto Rican Physicians and Scientists
- List of Puerto Rican scientists and inventors
- History of women in Puerto Rico
