= List of University of Puerto Rico at Mayagüez people =

Colegiales are persons affiliated with University of Puerto Rico at Mayagüez, commonly including alumni, current and former faculty members, students, and others. Here follows a list of notable colegiales.

Alumni proudly declare themselves "colegiales" even after graduating from the institution. Being a "colegial" becomes part of an individual's identity.

== Notable alumni ==
Alumni	Notability
Zayra Alvarez	Singer-songwriter and guitarist
Antonio Fas Alzamora	Former president of the Senate of Puerto Rico
Ricardo Aponte	Brigadier general of the United States Air Force; first Hispanic director, J-7, of the United States Southern Command, in Miami, Florida
Ricardo Azziz	Physician, scientist, executive, president of the Georgia Health Sciences University in Augusta, Georgia
F. Javier Cevallos	President of Kutztown University of Pennsylvania
Carlos Eugenio Chardón	First Puerto Rican mycologist
Edwin Cornier Colón	Aguadillan municipal legislator and youngest elected individual in Puerto Rico
Carlos Del Castillo	Received the Presidential Early Career Award for Scientists and Engineers Award
Herminio Brau del Toro	Lawyer, engineer, professor, writer, president of P.R. Distillers
Greetchen Diaz	Director of the Science Education Program at Ciencia Puerto Rico
Orlando Figueroa	Former director of NASA's Mars Exploration Program
Enectalí Figueroa-Feliciano	NASA astrophysicist and researcher; pioneered the development of position-sensitive detectors
Adolfo Figueroa Viñas	First Puerto Rican astrophysicist at NASA
Joxel García	Physician; former four-star admiral in the US Public Health Service Commissioned Corps; thirteenth assistant secretary for Health; president of the Ponce School of Medicine
Olga D. González-Sanabria	Scientist and inventor; highest-ranking Hispanic at NASA's Glenn Research Center; member of the Ohio Women's Hall of Fame
Jorge Haddock Acevedo	Former dean of the School of Business at the University of Richmond in Virginia and current president of the University of Puerto Rico
Amri Hernandez-Pellerano	Electronics engineer and scientist at NASA's Goddard Space Flight Center
Daniel López Romo	United States attorney for the District of Puerto Rico, brigadier general and assistant adjutant general for Air, Puerto Rico Air National Guard
Lissette Martinez	Lead electrical engineer for the Space Experiment Module program at the Wallops Flight Facility, part of NASA's Goddard Space Flight Center
Justo A. Méndez Rodriguez	Former senator in the Puerto Rico Legislature
Antonio Mignucci	Biological oceanographer specializing in the biology, management and conservation of marine mammals
William A. Navas, Jr.	First Puerto Rican to be named assistant secretary of the Navy
Silverio Pérez	Musician, comedian, entrepreneur, TV personality
Mercedes Reaves	Designed a viable full-scale solar sail at NASA's Langley Research Center
Fernando L. Ribas-Dominicci	F-111F pilot in the United States Air Force; killed during Operation El Dorado Canyon, the April 15, 1986 US air raid on Libya
Pedro N. Rivera	Retired brigadier general of United States Air Force; in 1994 became the first Hispanic medical commander in the Air Force
Juan A. Rivero	Founder of the Dr. Juan A. Rivero Zoo
Pedro Rodriguez	Director of a test laboratory at NASA; inventor of a portable, battery-operated lift seat for people suffering from knee arthritis
Ángel Rosa	Puerto Rico senator at-large; chair of Puerto Rico Senate Government Affairs and Economic Development Committee; associate professor of political science
Pedro Toledo	Former superintendent of the Puerto Rico Police Department

== Notable faculty ==
Faculty	Notability
Angel Gaud Gonzalez	Professor, Department of Physics
Edwin Irizarry Mora	Economist; Puerto Rican Independence Party candidate for governor of Puerto Rico in 2008; professor, Department of Economics
Juan A. Rivero	Founder of the Dr. Juan A. Rivero Zoo; Distinguished Professor, Department of Biology
Luisa R. Seijo Maldonado	Professor, Department of Social Sciences, activist and social worker

== Deans, vice chancellor and chancellors ==
	Dean	Years
1	Frank Lincoln Stevens	1911–1914
2	Ralph Stillman Garwood	1914–1920
3	Charles E. Horne	1920–1925
4	Frank Kern	1925–1926
5	Carlos Figueroa	1927–1933
6	H.G. Parkingson	1934–1936
7	Rafael Menéndez Ramos	1939–1941

	Vice chancellor	Years
1	Joseph Axtamayer	1941–1943
2	Luis Stefani	1943–1965

	Chancellor	Years
1	José Enrique Arrarás	1966–1971
2	Fred Soltero Harrington	1971–1973
3	Rafael Pietri Oms	1974–1979
4	Salvador Alemañy	1981–1984
5	José Luis Martínez Pico	1985–1989
6	Alejandro Ruiz Acevedo	1990–1993
7	Stuart J. Ramos	1994–1997
8	Antonio Santos Cabrera	1997–1998
9	Zulma Toro Ramos	1999–2001
10	Jorge Iván Vélez Arocho	2001–2009
11	Miguel Muñoz	2010–2013
12	Jorge Rivera Santos	2011–2013
13	John Fernández Van Cleve	2014–2017
14	Agustín Rullán Toro	2019–

== See also ==
- List of notable Puerto Ricans
- List of University of Puerto Rico people
