= Monserrate Román =

Puerto Rican scientist

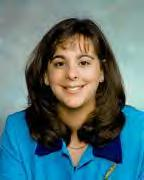
- Chief Microbiologist for the Environmental Control and Life Support System project. (Retired)
- Born: Puerto Rico
- Citizenship: United States
- Education: University of Puerto Rico (BS), University of Alabama in Huntsville (MS)
- Spouse: José Román
- Children: 3
- Awards: NASA Space Flight Awareness Honoree Award, NASA Silver Snoopy award, Space Station Program Office Team Excellence Award, Distinguished Performance Awards, NASA Innovation Award, Marshall Innovation Award
- Scientific career
- Fields: microbiology
- Institutions: National Aeronautics and Space Administration

Monserrate "Monsi" Román is a Puerto Rican microbiologist who worked at NASA on the life support systems aboard the International Space Station. As the former chief microbiologist for the Environmental Control and Life Support Systems (ECLSS) project, she helped ensure safe recycling of air and water in space. She later led NASA's Centennial Challenges Program, and supported the agency's transition to a commercial low Earth orbit economy.

== Early life and education ==
Román (birth name: Monserrate Román Cerezo) was born and raised in Puerto Rico. As a child she received medals at multiple science fairs. Román received a bachelor's degree from the University of Puerto Rico in 1980, where she focused on environmental microbiology. She then moved to Alabama for graduate studies at the University of Alabama in Huntsville, where she completed a master's degree in environmental microbiology in 1991. Her master's research investigated the toxin-release mechanisms of the bacterium Yersinia pestis, which causes plague.

== Career ==
Roman move to the United States in 1985. In 1989, Román was hired as a microbiologist by NASA's Marshall Space Flight Center (MSFC) in Huntsville, Alabama. As a microbiologist, Román studied microbes, living organisms and agents including viruses, bacteria, fungi and parasites. During her career, Ms Roman published more than 70 publications in these areas, along with flight hardware, life support systems and crowdsourcing.

Román was a member of the team that built the International Space Station. According to Román:

"As a little girl, I never dreamed I would be helping NASA build part of a Space Station. It has been fascinating watching the Station go from paper drawings to a real home and workplace in space."

She ensured safe water and air for the crew of the International Space Station. She led a team spanned across five NASA centers who develop Air Life Support Systems and Environmental Monitoring Systems for missions of long periods of time. She developed an in-flight monitor on the ISS and other space stations that can detect bacteria, viruses and fungi.

Monsi was the Program Manager for NASA Centennial Challenges. Monsi says, "My everything is about answering questions and solving puzzles."

In 2022, Román transitioned to a leadership role in NASA's Commercial Low Earth Orbit (LEO) Development Program Office. Her efforts contribute to enabling new destinations in low Earth orbit for research, commerce, and exploration.

Román retired from NASA in 2025.

== Selected publications ==
Monserrate Román has authored or co-authored over 60 technical publications focusing on space microbiology, biofilm formation, microbial monitoring, and life support systems.

- Martin, C. E., Summers, S. M., & Roman, M. C. (1998). Development of a system to assess biofilm formation in the International Space Station (NASA/TM-1998-207790). NASA Marshall Space Flight Center.
- "environmental control subsystems: Topics by Science.gov". www.science.gov.
- Benardini, James; Ballinger, Jordan; Crawford, Ronald L.; Roman, Monsi; Sumner, Randall; Venkateswaran, Kasthuri (2005-07-11). International Space Station Internal Active Thermal Control System: An Initial Assessment of the Microbial Communities within Fluid from Ground Support and Flight Hardware (Report). Warrendale, PA: SAE Technical Paper.
- Roman, M. C., Mitchell, M. A., Jones, W. L., & McCoy, J. (2005). Assessment of microbiologically influenced corrosion potential in the ISS internal active thermal control system heat exchanger materials: A 6-month study (SAE Technical Paper 2005-01-3077). SAE International. https://www.sae.org/publications/technical-papers/content/2005-01-3077
- Roman, M. C., Ott, C. M., & Pierson, D. L. (2010). Microbiological tests performed during the design of the ISS ECLSS: Part 1, bulk phase water and wastewater (NASA/TM-2010-216126). NASA. https://ntrs.nasa.gov/citations/20100033431
- Román, M. C. (2011). Monitoring of microbial loads during long duration missions as a risk reduction tool. Presented at the 5th IAASS Conference. NASA Technical Report. Retrieved from https://ntrs.nasa.gov/citations/20120001508
- Ott, C. M., Bruce, R. J., Pierson, D. L., Nickerson, C. A., Barrila, J., Castro, S. L., Roman, M. C., & Schuerger, A. C. (2013). Microbial monitoring of common opportunistic pathogens by comparing multiple real-time PCR platforms for potential space applications (NASA/TM-2013-217377). NASA.

== Media appearances ==
NPR Interview (2023): Román was featured on NPR's "Short Wave" podcast, where she discussed her role in designing the International Space Station's life support systems and the challenges of managing microbes in space environments.

NASA Podcast Appearance (2020): She appeared on NASA's "Small Steps, Giant Leaps" podcast, discussing the Centennial Challenges Program and its impact on technological advancements.

== Honors and awards ==
- On May 7, 2007, Román was honored by the U.S. Office of Personnel Management for her outstanding work for the government.
- In 2011, she received the NASA Silver Snoopy Award for her work, an award given to fewer than 1% of people working in aerospace.
- In 2017, Román received the Marshall Innovation Award in the Manager/Supervisory category.

== See also ==
- List of Puerto Ricans
- Puerto Rican scientists and inventors
- List of Puerto Ricans in the United States Space Program
- History of women in Puerto Rico
