= Miriam Rodón Naveira =

Puerto Rican scientist (born 1963)

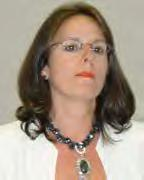
- The first Hispanic woman to serve as Deputy Director of the Environmental Sciences Division of the National Exposure Research Laboratory (NERL).
- Born: April 2, 1963 (age 63); San Juan, Puerto Rico
- Occupations: electronics engineer and scientist
- Spouse: Jacques Vachon
- Children: Sarah, Thomas

Miriam Rodón Naveira (born April 2, 1963) is an environmental scientist from San Juan, Puerto Rico, working at the federal government of the United States for which she was awarded a Silver Medal for Superior Service and a Suzanne Olive EEO and Diversity Award both by the EPA. She was also the first Hispanic woman to serve as branch chief of the EPA's National Exposure Research Laboratory (NERL) and later the first Hispanic woman to become deputy director of NERL's Environmental Sciences Division. Working at NASA since 2000, as of 2023 oversees research to enhance collaboration within DFRC, as well as with external entities, in support of the integrated use of remote sensing instruments in aerial platforms.

== Early years ==
Rodón Naveira was born on April 2, 1963 in San Juan, Puerto Rico, where she was raised and received both her primary and secondary education. Her mother was Miriam Naveira, the first female Chief Justice of the Supreme Court of Puerto Rico, and her father was a prominent businessman. After graduating from high school, she continued her academic education at Georgetown University, Washington D.C. where she earned an undergraduate degree in Psychology. She also holds a doctoral degree in Biology-Earth Science Micro-Ecology from Georgetown University.

In 1990, Rodón-Naveira worked with the United States Environmental Protection Agency as a biologist, project officer and environmental research scientist. In 1995, she became the first woman minority branch chief within the National Exposure Research Laboratory (NERL) and in 1998, the first Hispanic woman to hold the deputy directorship for the Environmental Sciences Division (ESD) within the NERL.

== Career at U.S. Environmental Protection Agency (EPA) ==
In 1990, Rodón-Naveira began her career with the U.S. Environmental Protection Agency (EPA) after completing her doctorate. In May 1996, she served as Chief of the Exposure Assessment Branch at the EPA's National Exposure Research Laboratory (NERL) in Research Triangle Park, North Carolina.

During this time, she co-authored studies on human exposure to environmental pollutants. She made contributions to the National Human Activity Pattern Survey, an EPA study used to assess Americans' exposure to toxins in various microenvironments.

She also conducted research in environmental microbiology. She was part of a team that studied diseases in marine life, publishing findings on blue crab health and disease processes (including the effects of viruses, bacteria, fungi, and other pathogens on crab populations).

== Career at NASA ==
In December 2000, Rodón-Naveira became an earth science remote sensing scientist with NASA at Dryden Flight Research Center in Edwards, California. Her responsibilities included coordinating and conducting research to enhance collaboration between Directorates within DFRC, NASA Ames Research Center at Moffett Field, California, universities, Indian tribes and other governments and international entities; all in support of the integrated use of remote sensing instruments.

Rodón-Naveira was involved with the Unmanned Aerial Vehicle (UAV) developmental activities within NASA DFRC Aerospace Projects Directorate. As science lead, she was responsible for developing collaborative partnership with the scientific community for the potential use of UAVs as unique science platforms in long-duration, long-range, and high-hazard missions.

Rodón-Naveira is currently "the Senior Safety Technical Manager within the Office of Safety and Mission Assurance...at NASA Dryden Flight Research Center (DFRC)", where she is responsible for "leading, coordinating and managing DFRC's safety and occupational training and competency projects to ensure a safe mission success." Her work involves interfacing with external partners at NASA's Ames Research Center, Moffett Field, and the State of California, as well as universities, Indian tribes and other national and international entities. Respected in her field, she is frequently invited as a speaker on scientific topics.

== STEM Outreach and Advocacy ==
Beyond her formal duties, Dr. Rodón Naveira has been actively involved in science, technology, engineering and mathematics (STEM) outreach and education, with emphasis on increasing diversity within these fields. During her tenure at NASA's Dryden Flight Research Center (now Armstrong Flight Research Center), she served as the Higher Education Director, overseeing internships and educational programs designed to connect students with NASA research initiatives.

She has frequently participated as a guest speaker at educational institutions and science-related events. In 2006, she delivered a lecture titled "Science Education for Tomorrow" at the University of Nebraska-Lincoln, where she discussed approaches to engaging students in science and presented opportunities available through NASA programs.

As part of NASA's Curriculum Improvement Partnership Award for the Integration of Research (CIPAIR) program, Dr Miriam Rodón Naveira served as a research mentor to undergraduate students participating in NASA-related STEM internships. Her mentorship supported projects ranging from environmental studies on the desert tortoise and burrowing owl to engineering work on the Space Launch System's Ground Power Disconnect Breakout Box. These efforts were part of a broader initiative to provide underrepresented minority students with hands-on research experiences that strengthen their academic and professional preparation in STEM fields.

== Personal life ==
Rodón Naveira has two grown children with her first husband- daughter-Sarah, and a son-Thomas A. Mace-Rodon. She is also the proud godmother to her foster daughter Julie Fuller. She is currently married to Jacques Vachon.

She participates in "institutional career days" providing information to students on careers related to science, engineering and technology, and in "NASA educational workshops" giving talks and hands-on demonstration projects, like the Earth-to-space linkup, to schools in the area of aeronautics and earth science. The Earth-to-space linkup is part of a weeklong training workshop for teachers from schools chosen for the National Aeronautics and Space Administration's Explorer School program. The workshop's goal is to help math and science teachers inspire the next generation of scientists and explorers of space. Rodon Naveira has been quoted as saying, "What better way than to have our teachers who are currently going through the workshop with us ... be able to ask questions of our astronauts in the International Space Station?"

== Accolades and recognitions ==
Some of the recognitions she has received include:

- US EPA Silver Medal Award (2001) - recognition for her scientific and management accomplishments
- US EPA's Suzanne Olive EEO and Diversity Award (2000) - recognition for her leadership in diversity management
- Outstanding Leadership in Management Award (1999) - Southern Nevada Federal Executive Association
- Congressional Certificate of Recognition (1999) - outstanding contributions to management in public service, awarded by Congressman James Gibbons
- Senatorial Recognition (1999) - distinguished public service, U S Senator Richard H. Bryan
- Rodón Naveira has been featured on the PBS documentary on Mojave Desert's Valley Fever (coccidioidomycosis) infection.
- University of Mount Saint Vincent Ad Laudem Dei Award (2008) - Honoring alumni for nationally significant professional achievements and a devotion to serving others through their work.

== See also ==
- List of Puerto Ricans
- Puerto Rican scientists and inventors
- List of Puerto Ricans in the United States Space Program
