= Félix Soto Toro =

Puerto Rican scientist and design engineer at NASA

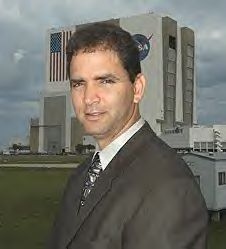
- Born: 1967 (age 58–59); Guaynabo, Puerto Rico
- Education: Florida Institute of Technology (B.E.E.)
- Occupations: Electronics engineer, scientist

Félix Soto Toro (born 1967), is an electrical designs engineer at NASA, who developed the Advanced Payload Transfer Measurement System.

== Early years ==
Soto Toro was raised in a poor section of the City of Guaynabo, Puerto Rico known as El Barrio Amelia. As a child, he was interested in everything that had to do with light bulbs and electricity. He obtained his primary and secondary education in his hometown and went to high school at the Colegio Madre Cabrini in San Juan.

In 1984, after graduating from high school, Soto Toro enrolled at the Florida Institute of Technology, located in Melbourne, Florida where he earned a Bachelor's degree in electrical engineering. In 1986, while in college, he decided that he would like to become an engineer for NASA. Soto Toro participated in the Cooperative Education Program.

== Career at NASA ==
In 1990, Soto Toro earned his bachelor's degree in science in electrical engineering. He was hired by NASA, a month after graduating and assigned to the Design Engineering Networks Communications section at Kennedy Space Center. In 1992, he completed his master's degree in science in electrical engineering, and by 1997, he completed another Masters in Science Degree. By specializing in the communications field of electrical engineering, he improved his credentials towards his goal of becoming an astronaut.

At the Kennedy Space Center, Soto Toro reviews, designs, builds, tests and implements engineering designs used in the Space Shuttle and Payload Operations Development Laboratories. The main project he developed was the Advanced Payload Transfer Measurement System, which consists of a simplified, robust, centrally operated and portable system that automatically measures the spherical coordinates offset between the trunnion and their supports during transfer operations. Soto Toro earned his Doctorate of Philosophy degree in Electrical Engineering and applied to become an astronaut candidate.

In NASA, Soto Toro works with testing ground support equipment used in pre-launch, launch and post-launch activities.

== Honors ==
Soto Toro was presented with the 2003 "El Premio Coqui" by La Casa de Puerto Rico in Florida for his contributions in the field of science. On November 9, 2003, Soto Toro, along with another Puerto Rican astronaut applicant, Henry Bursian Berríos, and Ninfa Segarra, who was the first Hispanic Deputy Mayor of New York City, were named the Grand Marshals of the Puerto Rican Day Parade held in Palm Bay, Florida. Soto Toro was twice given the Puerto Rico Role Model Award, by the Puerto Rico School system.

== See also ==
- List of Puerto Ricans
- Puerto Rican scientists and inventors
- List of Puerto Ricans in the United States Space Program
