= Miguel Roman =

Puerto Rican earth scientist

Miguel Román
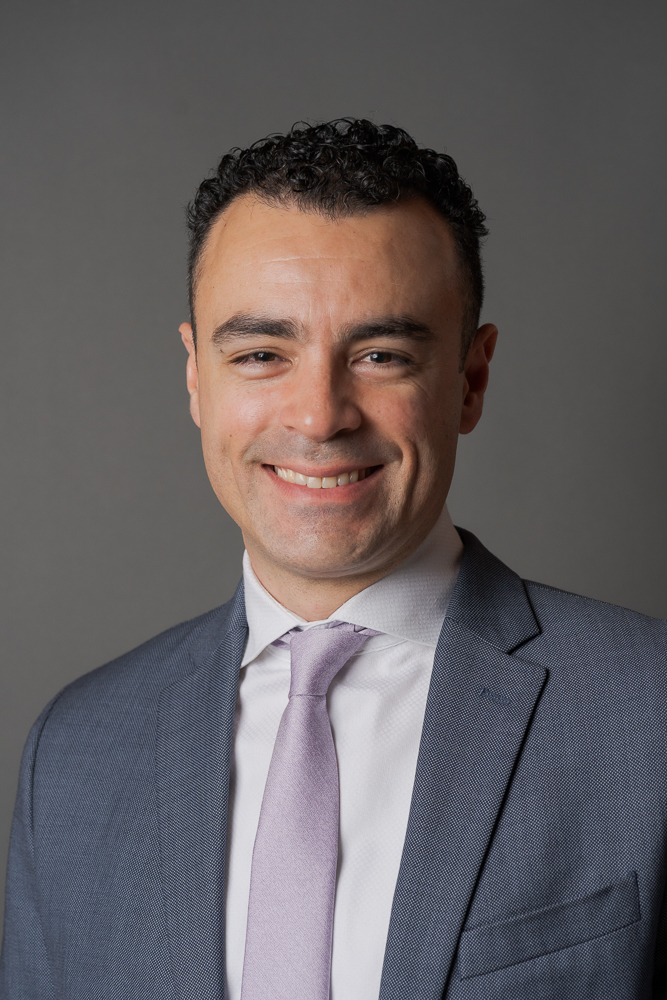
- Born: San Juan, Puerto Rico
- Education: University of Puerto Rico at Mayagüez; Cornell University; Boston University
- Occupations: Director for Atmospheres, NASA GSFC

Miguel Román is the Deputy Director for Atmospheres in the Earth Sciences Division at NASA’s Goddard Space Flight Center (GSFC), an organization dedicated to advancing our understanding of the Earth's atmospheric processes, including mesoscale meteorology, precipitation, atmospheric chemistry, aerosols and clouds, radiative transfer, and related climate studies. Formerly, Dr. Román was the Chief Climate Scientist for Leidos.

== Career ==
A leading expert in the fields of satellite remote sensing, climate change, disaster risk reduction, and sustainability, Román has championed translational research and data-intensive approaches to assess and address climate-related risks. His work is internationally recognized for shedding light on the disproportionate hardships experienced by socially-vulnerable and underserved communities following major disasters.

In 2022, Román was named the team leader of the Moderate Resolution Imaging Spectroradiometer (MODIS) science team for NASA's Terra and Aqua missions, a key flagship of the Earth Observing System (EOS). Román also serves as the land discipline leader for the Suomi-NPP and NOAA-20 Visible Infrared Imaging Radiometer Suite (VIIRS) science team, a worldwide group of investigators and technical staff in charge of one of the largest and most comprehensive polar-orbiting satellite systems operated by NASA and NOAA to monitor our planet's vital signs. He also spearheaded the development of NASA's Black Marble product suite, pioneering the first quantitative measurements of nocturnal visible and near-infrared imagery to meet the diverse needs of Earth science research and applications communities. This innovation has enabled critical analysis of urbanization, disaster response, and understanding humanity's impact on the planet.

== Honors ==
In 2016, Dr. Román was recognized by President Barack Obama with the Presidential Early Career Award for Scientists and Engineers (PECASE), the highest honor bestowed by the United States government on scientists and engineers beginning their independent careers. He is also a 2014 Service to America Medal Samuel J. Heyman Service to America Medals finalist, one of the highest honors for federal civil servants.

== Education ==
A native of San Juan, Puerto Rico, Dr. Román holds a bachelor's degree in electrical engineering from the University of Puerto Rico at Mayagüez, a master's degree in systems engineering from Cornell University, and a Ph.D. in geography from Boston University.

External videos
- You may listen Miguel Román describe his work at Leidos and NASA here

== Personal life ==
Román is married to noted astrophysicist and marathon runner Julia Román-Duval; they have three children.

== See also ==
- List of Puerto Ricans in the United States Space Program
- List of Puerto Rican Scientists and Inventors
