= Miguel Rodríguez (NASA) =

Puerto Rican scientist

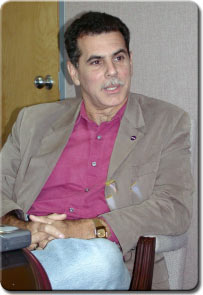
- Chief of the Integration Office of the Cape Canaveral Spaceport Management Office.
- Born: Santurce, Puerto Rico
- Occupations: electronics engineer and scientist

Miguel Rodríguez (born 1952) is the Chief of the Integration Office of the Cape Canaveral Spaceport Management Office.

== Early years ==
Rodríguez was born in Santurce, Puerto Rico, a section of the city of San Juan, Puerto Rico where he received both his primary and secondary education. In 1969, he along with millions of other people around the world, witnessed the historical moment when Neil Armstrong from the Apollo mission stepped on the Moon's surface. Like so many other young men at the time, Rodríguez felt inspired to consider a career in the Space program of the United States known as NASA.

After Rodríguez graduated from Colegio Espiritu Santo high school in Hato Rey, in 1971, he enrolled in the University of Puerto Rico at Mayagüez, where the Engineering College is located. Rodríguez earned his Mechanical Engineer Degree in 1976, however he had applied for a job with NASA in 1975, a year before his graduation. After graduating, he was called for an interview and offered a job in NASA. He became a mechanical engineer, designing parts for the Space Shuttle, at Marshall Space Flight Center in Huntsville, Alabama.

== Career in NASA ==
In 1979, Rodríguez was transferred to the Kennedy Space Center in Florida where he was responsible for the activation and validation of facilities for processing Space Shuttle payloads and experiments. He rose through the engineering ranks and was promoted to the position of Payload Integration Engineer responsible for the STS-31 Hubble Space Telescope payload processing, testing and launch activities. He started his management career in 1990 supervising a group of engineers responsible for integrating experiments in the Spacelab Module. He later was assigned the position of Division Chief for the International Space Station Resupply and Return, where he was responsible for managing the development and delivery of the first Italian built Multi-Purpose Logistics Module (MPLM), Leonardo.

In 1999, Rodríguez was requested to serve as the Chief of the Integration Office at Cape Canaveral Spaceport Management Office at the Cape Canaveral Air Force Station. He also led a team which developed a tool for capturing employee competencies and skills in support of the Agency Core Capabilities Assessment.

In 2002, Rodríguez moved to Mississippi and to the NASA Stennis Space Center as the Director of Center Operations and as a member of the Senior Executive Service where he managed facility construction, security and other programs for 4,500 Stennis personnel. After a year, he was assigned to the position of Director of the Propulsion Directorate at Stennis Space Center located in Mississippiresponsible for providing the leadership and the safe operation of one of a kind national test facilities valued at over $2 billion, including the operations of several rocket engine propulsion test programs such as Space Shuttle Main Engine acceptance testing and the testing and evaluation of the next generation propulsion systems. His team worked on the STS-114 engines which were installed on the Discovery Space Shuttle launched in August 2005.

In 2006, he returned to Kennedy Space Center, FL, as the Director of Operational Systems Engineering responsible for implementing operational technical authority across the KSC Programs and Projects. He also provided program and project Chief Engineers to lead the engineering support activities and was instrumental in the formation of the matrixed Engineering Directorate, a first at KSC, by successfully implementing the Agency's Governance Model in the Chief Engineering teams.

In 2008, he became the deputy director for the Management, Engineering and Technology Directorate, responsible for a 590 employee organization providing workforce and business services for operational engineering, processing, launch, and landing support for Shuttle Transition & Retirement, International Space Stations, Launch Services, Commercial Crew and 21st Century Ground Systems programs/projects. In December 2011, Rodríguez retired from NASA to start his own consulting business.

== Awards and recognitions ==
Among his awards and recognitions from NASA are:

- NASA Certificate of Commendation for leadership efforts after Hurricane Katrina
- Two NASA Exceptional Service Medals
- KSC Leadership Award
- NASA Silver Snoopy award.

== Currently ==
Miguel Rodríguez lives Satellite Beach, Florida with his wife. He is currently working as a Senior Program Manager for ASRC Federal managing the Wallops Engineering Services Contract located in NASA Wallops Flight Facility, Va.

== See also ==
- List of Puerto Ricans
