= National Exposure Research Laboratory =

The U.S. Environmental Protection Agency's National Exposure Research Laboratory (NERL) is a national laboratory that conducts research and development to find improved methods, measurements, and models to assess and predict exposures of humans and ecosystems to pollutants and other conditions in air, water, soil, and food. It is one of three national laboratories that conduct research for EPA's Office of Research and Development. NERL is also responsible for testing and establishing new Federal Reference Methods (FRM) and Federal Equivalent Methods (FEM). NERL is headquartered in Research Triangle Park, NC, and has locations in North Carolina, Ohio, Georgia and Nevada.

== NERL's Niches ==
The NERL focuses its efforts on the following areas:

- Analytical/Monitoring Methods Development
- Indicators/Indices of Exposure
- Exposure/Dose Process Characterization
- Decision Support Tools
- Predictive Modeling
- Source Apportionment/Environmental Forensics

== Publication Topics ==
NERL published papers in the following areas

- Air
  - Exposure
  - Measurement and Emissions
  - Modeling
  - Multipollutant
- Climate and Energy
  - Energy
  - Modeling
- Ecosystems
  - Ecological Risk Assessment
  - Ecosystems and Climate Change
- Human Health Risk Assessment
