= Nitza Margarita Cintrón =

Puerto Rican scientist

Dr. Nitza Margarita Cintrón
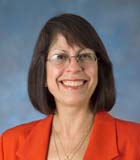
- The Chief of Space Medicine and Health Care Systems Office.
- Born: 1950 (age 75–76); San Juan, Puerto Rico
- Occupation: Scientist

Nitza Margarita Cintrón (born 1950) is a Puerto Rican scientist and former Chief of Space Medicine and Health Care Systems Office at NASA's Johnson Space Center. She currently works at the University of Texas in the Galveston Medical Branch as faculty in the Department of Internal Medicine.

== Early years ==
Cintrón was born in San Juan, Puerto Rico. As a child, she lived throughout Europe, while her father served in the U.S. Army. When her father retired, they returned to Puerto Rico and settled down in Santurce, a San Juan barrio. There she attended elementary and high school, where she excelled in science and mathematics. She read and studied biology, chemistry, astronomy and space.

Nitza Cintrón earned a bachelor's degree in Biology at the University of Puerto Rico. In 1972 she was accepted into the Biochemistry and Molecular Biology training program at Johns Hopkins University School of Medicine, and in 1978 she earned a Ph.D. degree there. In 1978, Cintrón read a recruitment announcement for the first mission specialist positions in the Astronaut Corps while completing her PhD research. She applied and went to Houston as a finalist, but initially did not make it after undergoing exams due to her poor eyesight. However, her academic credentials impressed NASA management and she was offered a position as a scientist by Dr. Carolyn Huntoon.

== Career ==
In 1979, Cintrón was the originator of the Biochemistry Laboratory at the Johnson Space Center. From 1979 through 1985, she served as project scientist for the Space Lab 2 mission that was launched aboard the Space Shuttle Challenger in 1985.

Among the positions held by Cintrón at NASA are "Chief of the Biomedical Operations and Research Branch in the Medical Science Division" and "Managing Director of the Life Sciences Research Laboratories" in support of medical operations. In 2004 she was named "Chief of NASA's (JSC) Space Medicine and Health Care Systems Office", which she continues to hold. Cintrón then announced that she take time off to care for her mother in Hatillo, Puerto Rico. She returned to NASA in March 2017. Cintrón said her mother was blessed by god.

After many years of service at NASA, she was sponsored by NASA after she was accepted as a student by the University of Texas Medical Branch in Galveston. She graduated in 1995 with a M.D. degree, and became a board-certified specialist in internal medicine. Three years later, in 1998, she was named a pioneer for women and Hispanics in the Hispanic Engineer and Information Technology journal.

== Recognition ==
Cintrón received many awards and honors.

- JSC Director's Commendation and Innovation Award - the center's highest award for a civil servants
- NASA Exceptional Scientific Achievement Medal, the highest science honor given by the agency.
- Hispanic Engineer's National Achievement Awards Conference (HENAAC) Hall of Fame (2004).
- 100 most influential Hispanics in the United States by Hispanic magazine (2006).

== See also ==
- List of Puerto Ricans
- Puerto Rican scientists and inventors
- List of Puerto Ricans in the United States Space Program
- History of women in Puerto Rico
