= Olga D. González-Sanabria =

American scientist from the territory of Puerto Rico

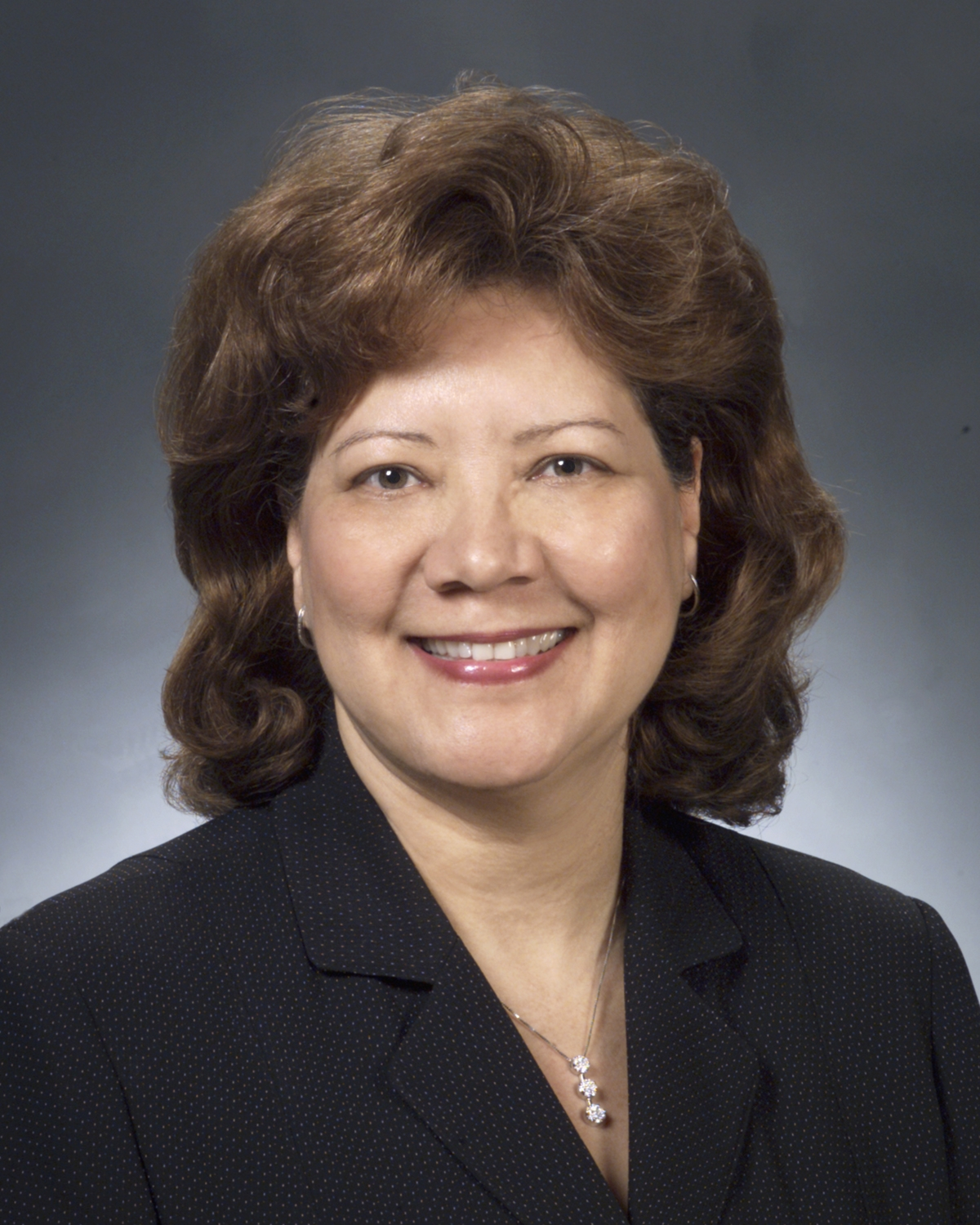
- Born: Patillas, Puerto Rico
- Education: University of Puerto Rico at Mayagüez (BS); University of Toledo (MS)
- Occupations: Scientist and inventor

Notes
- González-Sanabria played an instrumental role in the power systems area with the development of the "Long Cycle-Life Nickel-Hydrogen Batteries". She is a member of the Ohio Women's Hall of Fame

Olga D. González-Sanabria is a Puerto Rican scientist and inventor. She is the highest-ranking Hispanic at NASA Glenn Research Center, and a member of the Ohio Women's Hall of Fame. González-Sanabria, Director of the Engineering and Technical Services, is responsible for planning and directing a full range of integrated services including engineering, fabrication, testing, facility management and aircraft services for the Glenn Research Center. She played an instrumental role in the development of the "Long Cycle-Life Nickel-Hydrogen Batteries" which helps enable the International Space Station power system.

== Early years ==
González-Sanabria was born and raised in Patillas, Puerto Rico, USA, where she received both her primary and secondary education. She entered the University of Puerto Rico at Mayaguez after graduating from high school, and earned her Bachelor of Science in Chemical Engineering. She continued her academic education in the University of Toledo in Ohio where she earned her Master of Science degree in the same discipline.

== NASA career ==
In 1979, González-Sanabria began her NASA career as chief of its Glenn Research Center's Plans and Programs Office and executive officer to the Center's Director. During her career González-Sanabria also served as Director of the Systems Management Office during which she oversaw the implementation of Glenn's Business Management System (ISO 9000 certification).

González-Sanabria played an instrumental role in the power systems area with the development of the "Long Cycle-Life Nickel-Hydrogen Batteries". Her technical contributions helped to enable the International Space Station power system. She was awarded an R&D 100 Award in recognition of this effort.

González-Sanabria's governmental service is 30 years with NASA, where she still works today.

== Highest ranking Hispanic at NASA Glenn ==
In 2002, González-Sanabria was appointed to Senior Rank and named director of the Systems Management Office at NASA's Glenn Research Center, thus becoming the highest-ranking Hispanic at NASA Glenn. She was also named a member of the U.S. government's Senior Executive Service.

Her responsibilities include the development of Center level strategic processes, implementation planning, and decision guidelines for program direction and resource allocation. She also ensures development and implementation of Center policies, processes and procedures that are consistent with NASA's Program and Project Management Processes and Requirements and oversees the implementation of Glenn's Business Management System. She is also responsible for Plum Brook Station, a 6,400-acre (26 km^{2}) field station that houses four world-class research facilities. The Directorate is the largest at Glenn with a workforce of approximately 650 engineers, technicians, pilots, and support personnel.

González-Sanabria, who was featured together with her husband, Rafael Sanabria, as "NASA Glenn's Dynamic Duo" in HENAAC's Technical magazine's (Winter 2004 edition) cover story, also holds a patent and has authored/co-authored over 30 technical reports and presentations for journals and conferences. Among the technical reports which she has authored and or co-authored are:

- Effect of NASA advanced designs on thermal behavior of Ni-H2 cells (1987)
- Component variations and their effects on bipolar nickel-hydrogen cell performance (1987)
- NASA Aerospace Flight Battery Systems Program - Issues and actions (1988)
- Effect of NASA advanced designs on thermal behavior of Ni-H2 cells 2 (1988)
- Energy storage considerations for a robotic Mars surface sampler (1989)

== Awards and recognitions ==
On October 7, 2003, González-Sanabria was inducted into the Ohio Women's Hall of Fame under the category "scientist, inventor and executive". She joined other notable inductees such as Gloria Steinem, Maya Lin, Doris Day, and Elizabeth Blackwell.

Among the many awards which NASA has bestowed upon her are the following: The NASA Outstanding Leadership Medal (2002), and the NASA Exceptional Service Medal (1993). She also received the Women of Color in Technology Career Achievement Award (2000), and an R&D 100 Award (1988).

In 2007, HENAAC (Hispanic Engineer National Achievement Awards Conference) announced HENAAC Award Winners in Engineering & Science. According to HENNAC the winners in each category represent the nation's best and brightest engineers and scientists. They were selected by the HENAAC Selection Committee, an independent group of representatives from industry, government, military and academia. González-Sanabria was recognized under the category "Executive Excellence".

== Personal life ==
González-Sanabria lives in Strongsville, Ohio with her husband, Rafael, and their two daughters. During her spare time she has mentored numerous students with special attention to underrepresented groups and provided them with opportunities that allow them to gain meaningful experiences. She is also an active mentor to professionals at mid-career levels and actively supports their development and advancement.

== See also ==
- List of Puerto Ricans
- Puerto Rican scientists and inventors
- List of Puerto Ricans in the United States Space Program
- University of Puerto Rico at Mayaguez people
- History of women in Puerto Rico
