= Mercedes Reaves =

Puerto Rican electronics engineer

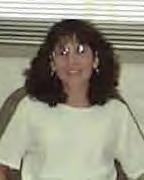
- Born: April 20, 1961 (age 65); Puerto Rico
- Education: University of Puerto Rico at Mayaguez
- Occupations: electronics engineer and scientist

Notes
- Reaves is responsible for the design of a viable full-scale solar sail .

Mercedes Reaves is a Puerto Rican research engineer and scientist. She is responsible for the design of a viable full-scale solar sail and the development and testing of a scale model solar sail at NASA Langley Research Center in Hampton, Virginia.

== Early years ==
Reaves was born and raised in Puerto Rico, where she received her primary and secondary education. She enrolled at the University of Puerto Rico at Mayaguez, where she obtained a Bachelor of Science degree in mechanical engineering. She continued her graduate education in the Old Dominion University.

== Career in NASA ==
During her career in NASA, Reaves has been involved in the research on modeling and validation of smart structures, the implementation of probabilistic analysis tools for dynamic model updates, simulation of ground-induced vibration of the HSCT (High Speed Civil Transport) as it traversed a typical runway and experiments to determine static and dynamic properties of advanced aircraft tires.

In August 2001, Reaves participated in a flight experiment called the Aero-structures Test Wing (ATW), conducted at NASA's Dryden Flight Research Center in Edwards, California. The experiment successfully demonstrated a new software data analysis tool, the flutterometer, which is designed to increase the efficiency of flight flutter testing.

The experiment consisted of an 18-inch carbon fiber test wing with surface-mounted piezoelectric strain actuators. The test wing was mounted on a special ventral flight test fixture and flown on Dryden's F-15B Research Testbed aircraft. At each Mach number and altitude, stability estimations of the wing were made using accelerometer measurements in response to the piezoelectric actuator excitation.

Placement of the piezoelectric actuators was determined by Reaves to maximize their effectiveness. Piezoelectric actuators are devices that produce a small displacement with a high force capability when voltage is applied. The actuators were moved at different magnitudes and frequency levels to induce wing vibrations and excite the dynamics during flight. The ATW experiment represents the first time that piezoelectric actuators were used during a flight flutter test.

== Current position ==
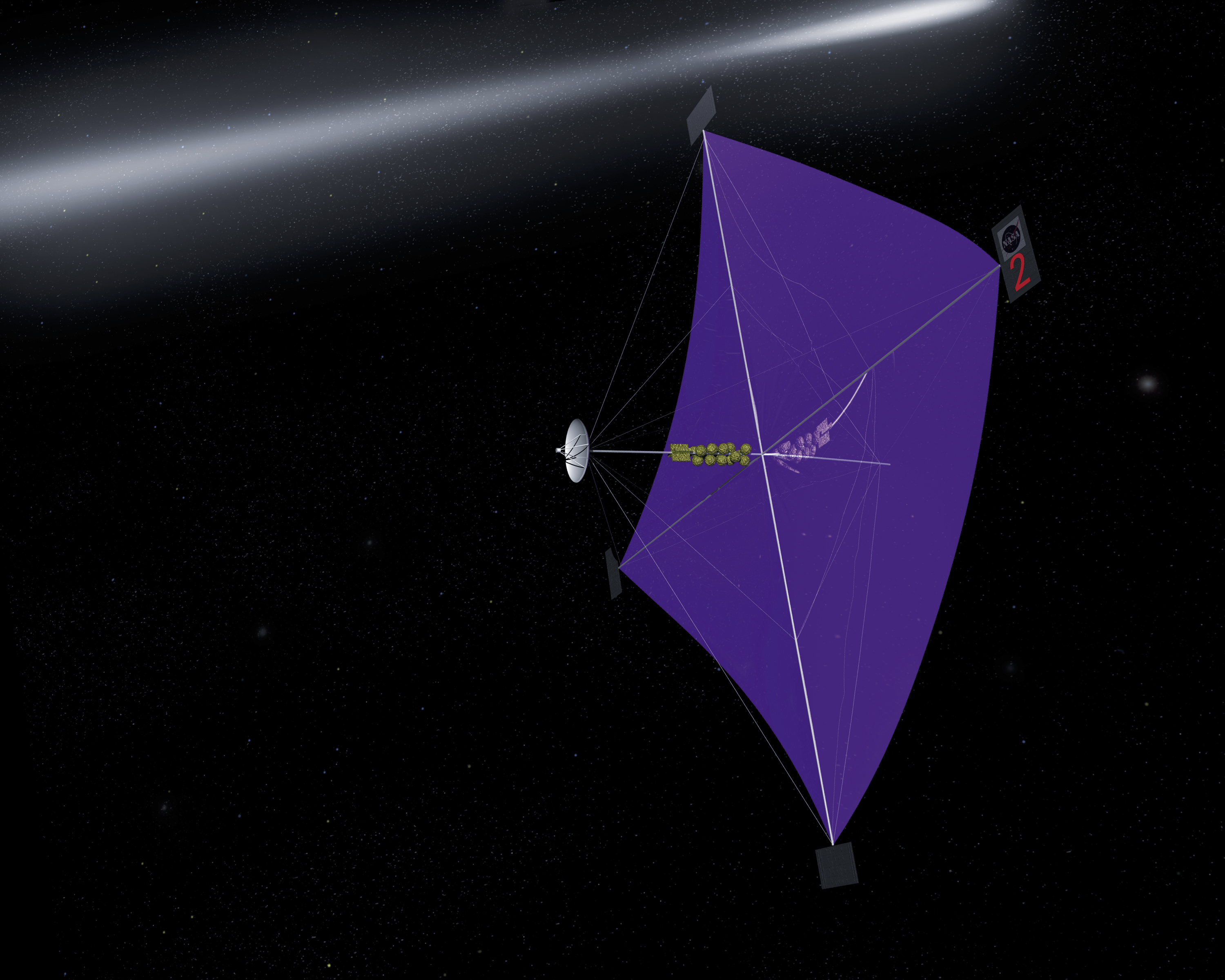
Solar Sail

She is currently the Research Engineer assigned to the Structural Dynamics Branch in the Structures and Materials Competency. As such, she conducts analytical and experimental research on vibration and dynamics of complex aerospace structures both individually and as a team member. This work requires application of state of the art advanced analytical methods to predict the dynamic response of complex aircraft and spacecraft configurations and validation of improved methodologies by correlating predicted results with experimental data from laboratory investigations

In her current assignment, she is responsible for the design of a viable full-scale solar sail and the development and testing of a scale model solar sail. She must select and apply tools to analyze complex thin film structures characterized by wrinkling, geometric and material nonlinear behavior. She is also responsible for planning experimental studies to validate analytical techniques and study solar sails dynamics.

== Publications ==
Among the technical reports which she has co-authored are:

- Finite-element-analysis model and preliminary ground testing of controls-structures interaction evolutionary model reflector (1992), Report Number: L-17009, NAS 1.154293, NASA-TM-4293
- Dynamics and control of a large displacement suspension system for ground testing of flexible space structures (1992), Report Number: AIAA PAPER 92-1178
- Langley's CSI evolutionary model Phase 2 (1995), Report Number: NAS 1.15109059, NASA-TM-109059, NIPS-95-06374
- Aeroservoelastic and Structural Dynamics Research on Smart Structures Conducted at NASA Langley Research Center (1997), Document ID: 20040110282
- Aeroservoelastic and Structural Dynamics Research on Smart Structures Conducted at NASA Langley Research Center (1998), Report Number: Paper 3316-21
- Taxiing, Take-Off, and Landing Simulation of the High Speed Civil Transport Aircraft (1999), Report Number: L-17901, NAS 1.15209531, NASA TM-1999-209531
- Test Cases for Modeling and Validation of Structures with Piezoelectric Actuators (2001), Report Number: AIAA Paper 2001-1466
- A Probabilistic Approach to Model Update (2001), Report Number: L-18097, NAS 1.15211039, NASA TM-2001-211039
- Test cases for modeling and validation of structures with piezoelectric actuators (2001)
- Ground and Flight Test Structural Excitation Using Piezoelectric Actuators (2002), Report Number: AIAA Paper 2002–1349, H-2482, NAS 1.15210724, NASA TM-2002-210724
- Piezoelectric Actuator Modeling Using MSC NASTRAN and MATLAB (2003), Report Number: L-19005, NAS 1.15212651, NASA TM-2003-212651
- Model Update of a Micro Air Vehicle (MAV) Flexible Wing Frame with Uncertainty Quantification (2004), Report Number: NASA TM-2004-213232
- On the Application of a Response Surface Technique to Analyze Roll-over Stability of Capsules with Airbags Using LS-Dyna (2008)
- Ares I-X Flight Test Vehicle Modal Test (2010)
- Ares I-X Launch Vehicle Modal Test Overview (2010)
- Multi-Dimensional Calibration of Impact Dynamic Models (2011)
- Orion crew module landing system simulation and verification (2011)

== See also ==
- List of Puerto Ricans
- Puerto Rican scientists and inventors
- List of Puerto Ricans in the United States Space Program
- University of Puerto Rico at Mayaguez people
- History of women in Puerto Rico
