= Adolfo Figueroa Viñas =

Puerto Rican astrophysicist

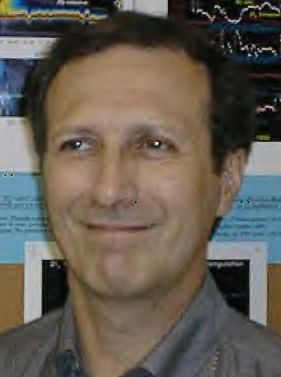
- Born: 11 November 1949 (age 76); Arecibo, Puerto Rico
- Education: University of Puerto Rico at Mayagüez; Massachusetts Institute of Technology
- Scientific career
- Fields: Astrophysicist
- Workplaces: Goddard Space Flight Center

Adolfo Figueroa Viñas is the first Puerto Rican astrophysicist at the National Aeronautics and Space Administration (NASA) and is an expert in solar and space plasma physics at the Heliophysics Science Division. As a staff scientist his research interests include studying plasma kinetic physics and magnetohydrodynamics of the solar wind, heliosphere, shock waves, MHD and kinetic simulation of plasma instabilities, and turbulent processes associated with space, solar and astrophysical plasmas.

== Early years ==
Viñas was born in Arecibo, Puerto Rico. He studied at the University of Puerto Rico at Mayagüez. where he received a B.S. and M.S. in physics in 1970 and 1972, respectively. He later studied at the Massachusetts Institute of Technology (MIT), where he received a Ph.D. in physics in 1980. Between 1970 and 1974, he worked as an instructor and assistant professor of physics at the University of Puerto Rico. He joined Goddard Space Flight Center in 1980, where he has held multiple positions. He currently is a staff scientist in the Geospace Physics Laboratory of the Heliophysics Science Division at Goddard. He has served as Adjunct Visiting Physics Professor at the Universidad de Concepción (Chile), at the Universidade do Estado do Rio de Janeiro (Brazil), and at the Universidad de Alcalá de Henáres-Madrid (Spain).

== NASA ==
Viñas has pioneered methods for the analysis of plasma particle detectors on board spacecraft. He has conceived and developed a technique for the determination of the fluid moments of velocity distribution function in space plasma measurements from particle detectors. This method is currently being tested for implementation on board any satellite CPU processing unit with particle detectors, to reduce the amount of data required to compute the moments on ground with only a small amount of measurements required via telemetry to unpack the physical quantities on ground. Viñas has also pioneer work to resolve the geometrical properties, propagation velocity, and characteristics of shock waves from simple conservation principles. His work has received national and international recognition (known as the Viñas-Scudder Method) because it is the most accurate and robust method for in-situ shock characteristics determination from space plasma measurements. The Viñas-Scudder method have been implemented into an Interactive Data Language (IDL) visualization tool named SDAT (Shock and Discontinuities Analysis Tool) for distribution to the scientific community and investigators interested in shock physics.

== Currently ==
Viñas is a staff astrophysicist at the Geospace Physics Laboratory of the Heliophysics Science Division at the NASA Goddard Space Flight Center in Greenbelt, Maryland. Viñas continues actively in research and lecturing at various national and international research centers and universities, He is also a post-doctoral mentor and adviser to many national and international young scientists. He is currently an active member of the American Physical Society (APS), the American Geophysical Union (AGU), and a founding member of the Latin American Association for Space Geophysics (ALAGE).

== Selected publications ==
- Viñas, A F; Gurgiolo, C (2009). "Spherical harmonic analysis of particle velocity distribution function: Comparison of moments and anisotropies using Cluster data". Journal of Geophysical Research. 114 (A1): A01105. Bibcode:2009JGRA..114.1105V. doi:10.1029/2008JA013633.
- Nieves-Chinchilla, T; Viñas, A F (2008). "Kappa-like distribution functions inside magnetic clouds". Geofísica Internacional. 47 (3): 245–249. doi:10.22201/igeof.00167169p.2008.47.3.86. ISSN 0016-7169.
- Nieves-Chinchilla, T; Viñas, A F (2008). "Solar wind electron distribution functions inside magnetic clouds". J. Geophys. Res. Space Phys. 113 (A2): A02105. Bibcode:2008JGRA..113.2105N. doi:10.1029/2007JA012703.
- Burlaga, L F; Viñas, A F; Wang, C (2007). "Tsallis distributions of magnetic field strength variations in the heliosphere: 5 to 90 AU". J. Geophys. Res. Space Phys. 112 (A7): A07206. Bibcode:2007JGRA..112.7206B. doi:10.1029/2006JA012213.
- Ofman, L; Viñas, A F (2007). "Two-dimensional hybrid model of wave and beam heating of multi-ion solar wind plasma". J. Geophys. Res. Space Phys. 112 (A6): A06104. Bibcode:2007JGRA..112.6104O. doi:10.1029/2006JA012187.
- Burlaga, L F; Viñas, A F (2007). "Tsallis distribution functions in the solar wind: Magnetic field and velocity observations". AIP Conference Proceedings. 965: 259–266. Bibcode:2007AIPC..965..259B. doi:10.1063/1.2828742.
- Burlaga, L F; Viñas, A F; Ness, N F; Acuña, M H (2006). "Tsallis statistics of the magnetic field in the heliosheath". Astrophys. J. 644 (1): L83–L86. Bibcode:2006ApJ...644L..83B. doi:10.1086/505577.
- Viñas, A F; Mace, R L; Benson, R F (2005). "Dispersion characteristics for plasma resonances of Maxwellian and Kappa distribution plasmas and their comparisons to the IMAGE/RPI observations". J. Geophys. Res. Space Phys. 110 (A06202): A06202. Bibcode:2005JGRA..110.6202V. doi:10.1029/2004JA010967.
- Araneda, J A; Viñas, A F; Astudillo, H F (2002). "Proton core temperature effects on the relative drift and anisotropy evolution of the ion beam instability in the fast solar wind". J. Geophys. Res. Space Phys. 107 (1453): SSH 8–1. Bibcode:2002JGRA..107.1453A. doi:10.1029/2002JA009337. hdl:10533/173396.
- Viñas, A F; Wong, H K; Klimas, A J (2000). "Generation of electron suprathermal tails in the upper solar atmosphere: Implications for coronal heating". Astrophys. J. 528 (1): 509–523. Bibcode:2000ApJ...528..509V. doi:10.1086/308151.
- Viñas, A F; Wong, H K; Klimas, A J (1998). "Generation of electron plasma and ion acoustic waves by long wavelength, field aligned electric field fluctuations". Physics of Space Plasmas: Multiscale Phenomena. 15. MIT Center for Theoretical Geo/Cosmo Plasma Physics: 325.
- Fung, S F; Viñas, A F (1994). "Excitation of high-frequency electromagnetic waves by energetic electrons with a loss cone distribution in a field-aligned potential drop". J. Geophys. Res. 99 (A5): 8671–8686. Bibcode:1994JGR....99.8671F. doi:10.1029/94JA00251. ISSN 0148-0227.
- Miller, J A; Viñas, A F (1993). "Ion acceleration and abundance enhancements by electron beam instabilities in impulsive solar flares". Astrophys. J. 412 (1): 386–400. Bibcode:1993ApJ...412..386M. doi:10.1086/172928. ISSN 0004-637X.
- Miller, J A; Viñas, A F; Reames, D V (1993). "Heavy ion acceleration and abundance enhancements in impulsive solar flares". Proceedings of 23rd International Cosmic Ray Conference. 3: 17. Bibcode:1993ICRC....3...17M.
- Miller, J A; Viñas, A F; Reames, D V (1993). "Selective ^{3}He and Fe acceleration in impulsive solar flares". Proceedings of 23rd International Cosmic Ray Conference. 3: 13. Bibcode:1993ICRC....3...13M.
- Viñas, A F (1990). "NASA's space physics theory program: An opportunity for collaboration". Proceedings of the Space Conference of the Americas. 2: 54. Bibcode:1990sca.....1...54V.
- Viñas, A F; Goldstein, M L (1991). "Parametric instabilities of circularly polarized large-amplitude dispersive Alfvén waves: excitation of parallel-propagating electromagnetic daughter waves". J. Plasma Phys. 46 (1): 107–127. Bibcode:1991JPlPh..46..107V. doi:10.1017/S0022377800015981. S2CID 119789685.
- Viñas, A F; Goldstein, M L (1991). "Parametric instabilities of circularly polarized large-amplitude dispersive Alfvén waves: excitation of obliquely-propagating electromagnetic daughter waves". J. Plasma Phys. 46 (1): 129–152. Bibcode:1991JPlPh..46..129V. doi:10.1017/S0022377800015993. S2CID 123260086.
- Leubner, M P; Viñas, A F (1986). "Stability analysis of double-peaked proton distribution functions in the solar wind". J. Geophys. Res. 91 (A12): 13366–13372. Bibcode:1986JGR....9113366L. doi:10.1029/JA091iA12p13366.
- Viñas, A F; Scudder, J D (1985). "Fast and optimal solution to the 'Rankine-Hugoniot problem'". J. Geophys. Res. 91 (A1): 39–58. Bibcode:1986JGR....91...39V. doi:10.1029/JA091iA01p00039. hdl:2060/19850022411.
- Viñas, A F; Madden, T R (1985). "Shear flow-ballooning instability as a possible mechanism for hydromagnetic fluctuations". J. Geophys. Res. 91 (A2): 1519–1528. Bibcode:1986JGR....91.1519V. doi:10.1029/JA091iA02p01519.
- Fairfield, D H; Viñas, A F (1984). "The inner edge of the plasma sheet and the diffuse aurora". J. Geophys. Res. 89 (A2): 841–854. Bibcode:1984JGR....89..841F. doi:10.1029/JA089iA02p00841. hdl:2060/19830024324. S2CID 122819730.
- Viñas, A F; Goldstein, M L; Acuña, M H (1984). "Spectral analysis of magnetohydrodynamic fluctuations near interplanetary shocks". J. Geophys. Res. 89 (A6): 3762–3774. Bibcode:1984JGR....89.3762V. doi:10.1029/JA089iA06p03762. hdl:11603/30530.

== See also ==
- List of Puerto Ricans
- Puerto Rican scientists and inventors
- List of University of Puerto Rico at Mayagüez people
- List of Puerto Ricans in the United States Space Program
