= Silver Snoopy award =

NASA Award for safety

Silver Snoopy Award
- Silver Snoopy Award
- Awarded for: Outstanding achievements related to human flight safety or mission success. Presented personally by astronauts as their own recognition of excellence.
- Country: United States
- Presented by: NASA Astronauts
- First award: 1968
- Website: Official website

The Silver Snoopy award is a special honor awarded to NASA employees and contractors for outstanding achievements related to human flight safety or mission success. The award certificate states that it is "In Appreciation" "For professionalism, dedication and outstanding support that greatly enhanced space flight safety and mission success." The award depicts Snoopy, a character from the Peanuts comic strip created by Charles M. Schulz.

The award is given personally by NASA astronauts as it represents the astronauts' own recognition of excellence. It is presented at the workplace of the recipient with the recipient's coworkers present. The Silver Snoopy award is one of several awards overseen by the Space Flight Awareness (SFA) program at NASA.

The award consists of a sterling silver "Silver Snoopy" lapel pin flown during a NASA mission, a commendation letter (stating the mission the Silver Snoopy pin was flown on) and a signed, framed Silver Snoopy certificate. Snoopy decals and posters are also given to the recipient.

== History ==
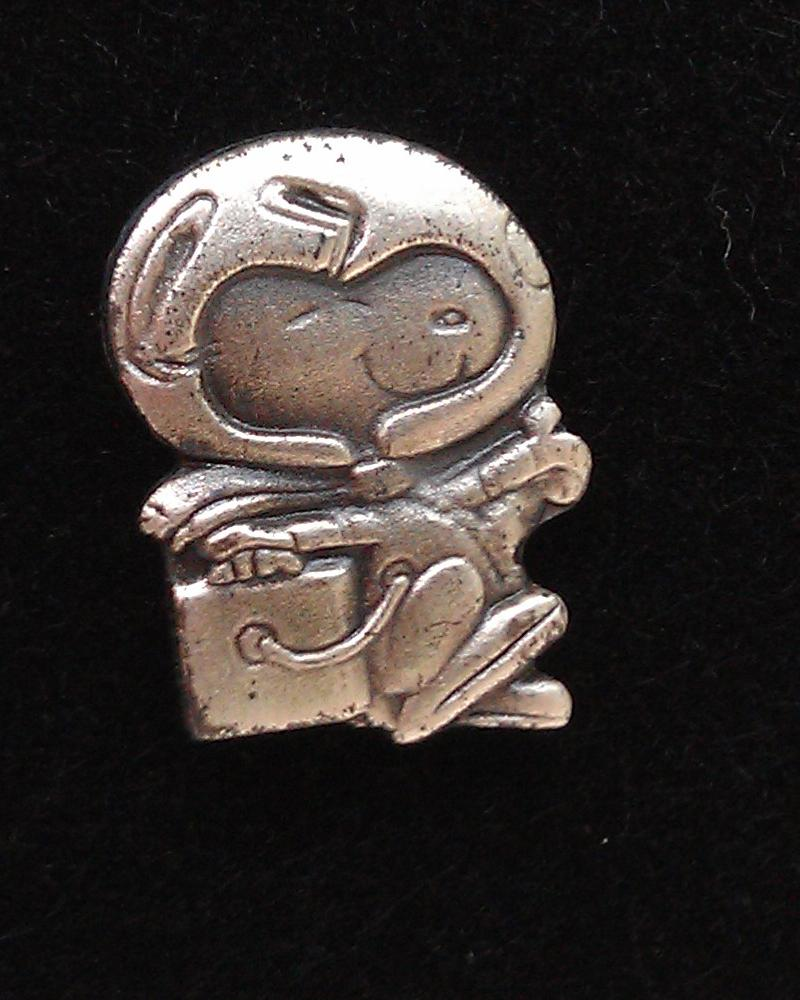
Silver Snoopy pin flown during STS-116.

After the completion of the Mercury and Gemini projects, NASA wanted a way to promote greater awareness among its employees and contractors of the impact they had on flight safety, the flight crews and their missions. NASA wanted to use a symbol for spaceflight that would be well known and accepted by the public, similar to the recognition received by the United States Forest Service's Smokey Bear.

The idea for the Silver Snoopy award came from Al Chop, who was director of the public affairs office for the Manned Spacecraft Center (now called the Lyndon B. Johnson Space Center). He wanted to create an award featuring Snoopy as an astronaut to be given by astronauts in recognition of outstanding contributions by employees.

Charles M. Schulz, who was an avid supporter of the U.S. space program, welcomed the idea of using Snoopy for the award. Schulz and United Feature Syndicate (the distributor of the Peanuts comic strip) agreed to let NASA use "Snoopy the Astronaut" at no cost. Schulz himself drew the image the award pin was based on. He also drew promotional art for posters to promote the award program.

== Requirements ==
Employees of NASA or one of its contractors can be considered for a Silver Snoopy award if they have satisfied one or more of the following criteria:

- Significantly contributed beyond their normal work requirements to the development and implementation of human spaceflight programs while ensuring quality and safety.
- Accomplished single specific achievements that have had significant impact on attainment of a particular human spaceflight program goal while ensuring quality and safety.
- Contributed to a major cost saving or a series of lesser cost savings pertaining directly to human spaceflight programs.
- Has been instrumental in developing modifications to human spaceflight mission hardware, software, or materials that increase reliability, efficiency, or performance.
- Assisted in operational improvements that increase efficiency or performance.
- Has been a key player in developing a beneficial process improvement of significant magnitude.
- Contributed significantly beyond fundamental task accountabilities in support of the NASA programs.
- Sustained quality performance over an extended period of time in support of human spaceflight programs.

== Recipients ==
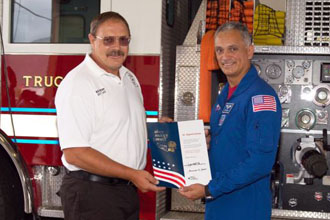
EMT Ralph Brown receives the award from astronaut Danny Olivas

Since 1968, the program has awarded almost fifteen thousand people with a Silver Snoopy, as of January 2016.

Silver Snoopy awards are limited to no more than 1% of eligible recipients. An individual can only receive one Silver Snoopy Award in their lifetime. However, Michael Arrington, a journalist at the Marshall Space Flight Center, received two. The award is not given posthumously or as a recognition award for an individual's longevity, retirement, or separation from service. In the event that a pin is lost, it may be replaced with a non-flown pin at the SFA Panel's discretion. It is a high honor within NASA.
