= Enectalí Figueroa-Feliciano =

Puerto Rican physicist

Enectalí Figueroa
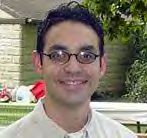
- Born: 1971 (age 54–55); Mayagüez, Puerto Rico
- Education: Stanford University
- Occupations: physicist, astrophysicist
- Scientific career
- Workplaces: Northwestern University
- Thesis: (2001)
- Website: Northwestern University

Notes
- Pioneered the development of Transition-Edge-Sensor (TES) detectors for astrophysics and physics.

Enectalí "Tali" Figueroa-Feliciano (born 1971) is a Puerto Rican physicist and professor at Northwestern University who pioneers the development and application of transition edge sensor (TES) detectors to experiments for detecting dark matter, neutrino interactions, and for X-ray astronomy.

== Early years ==
Figueroa-Feliciano was born in 1971 in the city of Mayagüez, Puerto Rico, which is located on the western coast of the island. After he graduated in 1989 from high school C.R.O.E.M. (Centro Residencial de Opportunidades Educativas en Mayaguez), he attended the University of Puerto Rico, Mayagüez Campus and, in 1995, earned a Bachelor of Science degree in mechanical engineering.

== NASA ==
Figueroa-Feliciano continued his academic studies at Stanford University, earning a master's degree (1997) and doctorate (2001) in physics. While studying at Stanford, Figueroa-Feliciano did his dissertation research at NASA Goddard Space Flight Center in Maryland, as part of the Science Cooperative Education program. Upon his graduation from Stanford, Figueroa-Feliciano became an astrophysicist for the Goddard Space Flight Center, where he served as the microcalorimeter leader for the Generation-X Vision Mission; and as a member of the following teams: Constellation-X facility science team, Suzaku Observatory science working group, and the X-ray Quantum Calorimeter (XQC) sounding rocket team.

Figueroa-Feliciano pioneered the development of position-sensitive detectors that will provide an order of magnitude more pixels (and thus larger field of view) than traditional single-pixel X-ray microcalorimeters. He has received several NASA awards for the development and demonstration of position-sensitive x-ray microcalorimeters.

He served as President of the Sixth Executive Council of the NASA Academy Alumni Association from August 1, 2003, to December 31, 2004. In September 2003, Figueroa-Feliciano was interviewed for the position of Astronaut candidate.

== Awards and distinctions ==
Figueroa-Feliciano was awarded a NSF Early Career Development Grant while at MIT. He is a Kavli Frontiers of Science Fellow.

== Career and Research ==
Figueroa-Feliciano is an associate professor of physics at Northwestern University. His current research goals include the search for dark matter (both directly and indirectly), the study of neutrino-nucleon scattering, and X-ray astronomy. His work on dark matter was featured in the 2008 NOVA scienceNOW program "Dark Matter" on PBS. In 2010, he received the National Science Foundation CAREER Award.

== Selected publications by Figueroa-Feliciano ==
Figueroa-Feliciano has contributed to the following publications as author or co-author:

- Position-sensitive low-temperature detectors; E. Figueroa-Feliciano. Invited review in Nuclear Instruments and Methods in Physics Research pp. 496–501, 2004.
- Cryogenic Microcalorimeters, M. Galeazzi and E. Figueroa-Feliciano. Contributed chapter in .X-ray Spectrometry: Recent Technological Advances; John Wiley & Sons, 2004.
- Position-sensitive transition edge sensor modeling and results; C. Hammock, E. Figueroa-Feliciano, E. Apodaca, S. Bandler, K. Boyce, J. Chervenak, F. Finkbeiner, R. Kelley, M. Lindeman, S. Porter, T. Saab, and C. Stahle. Nuclear Instruments and Methods in Physics Research; pp. 505–507, 2004.
