= Fernando López Tuero =

Spanish agronomist in Puerto Rico

- Born: 8 September 1857; Murcia, Spain
- Died: 1907 (aged 49–50); Logroño, Spain
- Occupations: Agricultural scientist and agronomist

Fernando López Tuero (1857–1907) was a Spanish agronomist who worked for several years in Puerto Rico during the final decade of Spanish colonial rule. He is best known for identifying the white grub, larvae of scarab beetles of the genus Phyllophaga, as the cause of the 1890s sugarcane epidemic on the island. His work is regarded as one of the earliest scientific contributions to agricultural research in Puerto Rico.

== Life and career ==
Fernando López Tuero was born in Murcia on 8 September 1857 and completed his studies in agricultural engineering in 1888. Shortly afterward he was appointed director of the Agronomic Station of Río Piedras in Puerto Rico, where the colonial government sought to modernize agricultural production through systematic scientific research. During the 1890s he worked on crop diseases, soil management and the modernization of tropical agriculture. When the station closed, he returned to Spain and took part in several agricultural development projects in Seville, La Rioja and Murcia. Between 1890 and 1897 he published a series of essays on tropical crops and rural economy. He died in 1907 in Logroño (La Rioja).

== Agricultural epidemic ==
In the late 19th century an epidemic was affecting the agricultural industry of Puerto Rico. Among the crops affected was sugarcane, whose main product, sugar, was vital to the island’s economy. Sugarcane planters faced a severe decline in yields due to a mysterious die-off in cane fields. The Spanish colonial government created an emergency commission composed of scientists, which included Dr. Agustín Stahl and Fernando López Tuero, to study the situation. Stahl suggested that a soil-borne “germ” was responsible, but available evidence was inconclusive.

As director and head agronomist of the Agronomical Station of Río Piedras, López Tuero conducted field inspections and root analyses in 1894, demonstrating that the true cause of the epidemic was the white grub, larvae of scarab beetles of the genus Phyllophaga, which feed on the roots of grasses and other plants. His diagnosis overturned previous theories and allowed for the development of targeted pest-control measures.

Early twentieth-century entomologists working for the agricultural experiment station of the Sugar Producers Association in Puerto Rico, including Eugene G. Smyth and George N. Wolcott, built upon López Tuero’s findings. Their life-history studies and control recommendations repeatedly cited his 1894 discovery as the foundation for scientific research on sugarcane pests in Puerto Rico.

== Early contributions to biological control ==
In his 1895 treatise on sugarcane, López Tuero recommended introducing parasitoid wasps such as Apanteles and Euplectrus species to control the sugarcane borer Diatraea saccharalis. Modern analyses identify this as a precursor to integrated pest management in Caribbean agriculture.

López Tuero's scientific investigations have been discussed by María Teresa Cortés Zavala in her study Fernando López Tuero, La Revista de Agricultura, Industria y Comercio de Puerto Rico y el progreso agrícola de 1885–1898, written for the Escuela de Historia, Universidad Michoacana de San Nicolás de Hidalgo.

== Political thought ==
Across his political writings, López Tuero argued that the primary function of the state was to protect private property, a position consistent with the interests of large rural landowners during a period of agrarian transformation in Puerto Rico. His ideas gained traction during debates over the Ley Municipal de la Isla de Puerto-Rico, a municipal law passed by Spain for Puerto Rico and promulgated on 24 May 1878 by the Ministerio de Ultramar (Ministry of Overseas Territories), which strengthened centralized policing powers to safeguard large estates in the countryside. Historians, including Rosa E. Carrasquillo, have linked this legal framework to efforts to control landless rural workers and maintain elite economic dominance.

== Selected works ==
López Tuero authored numerous agronomic publications as well as political and socio-economic works. His principal agronomic publications include:

- López Tuero, Fernando (1889). Cultivos perfeccionados – Arroz y cacao (in Spanish). Puerto Rico: Imprenta de Acosta.
- López Tuero, Fernando (1890). Cultivos perfeccionados – Maíz y tabaco (in Spanish). Puerto Rico: Imprenta de Acosta.
- López Tuero, Fernando (1891). Cultivos perfeccionados – Café y piña de América (in Spanish). Puerto Rico: Imprenta y Librería de Acosta.
- López Tuero, Fernando (1892). Cultivos tropicales: plátano y palma de coco (in Spanish). Puerto Rico.
- López Tuero, Fernando (1892). Cultivos tropicales: añil y vainilla (in Spanish). Puerto Rico: Junta Provincial de Agricultura, Industria y Comercio; Imprenta del «Boletín Mercantil».
- López Tuero, Fernando (1895). La caña de azúcar (in Spanish). San Juan: Tipografía del «Boletín Mercantil».
- López Tuero, Fernando (1895). La caña de azúcar en Puerto Rico, su cultivo y enfermedad. Puerto Rico: Tipografía del «Boletín Mercantil».
- López Tuero, Fernando (1895). Teoría moderna contraria a la influencia de la vegetación en la producción de las lluvias locales (in Spanish). San Juan: Imprenta del «Boletín Mercantil».
- López Tuero, Fernando (1896). Valoración de materias agrícolas (in Spanish). Madrid: Librería de Fernando Fé.
- López Tuero, Fernando (1896). Estado moral de los factores de la producción en Cuba y Puerto Rico (in Spanish). Madrid: Imprenta de Fernando Fé.
- López Tuero, Fernando (1896). Tratado de cultivos tropicales. Madrid: Imprenta Hernando.
- López Tuero, Fernando (1897). Enfermedad de la caña de azúcar y modo de combatirla (in Spanish) (2 ed.). Madrid: Librería de Fernando Fé.

His political and socio-economic writings include:

- López Tuero, Fernando (1891). Isla de Puerto-Rico. La reforma agrícola (in Spanish). San Juan: Tipografía del «Boletín Mercantil».
- López Tuero, Fernando (1893). Isla de Puerto-Rico: estudios de economía rural (in Spanish). San Juan: Tipografía del «Boletín Mercantil».
- López Tuero, Fernando (1896). El pesimismo autonomista de las Antillas. Madrid: Imprenta de González.
- López Tuero, Fernando (1900). Unitarismo de la patria española: la descentralización, el regionalismo, Portugal, Gibraltar, síntesis del unitarismo (in Spanish). Madrid: Ricardo Fé.
- López Tuero, Fernando (1905). Tratado de sociología agrícola (in Spanish). Madrid: Ricardo Fé.

== See also ==
- List of Puerto Ricans
- Puerto Rican scientists and inventors
