= List of Puerto Rican scientists and inventors =

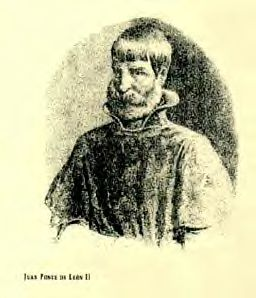
Juan Ponce de León II, c. 1581, arguably the first Puerto Rican scientist

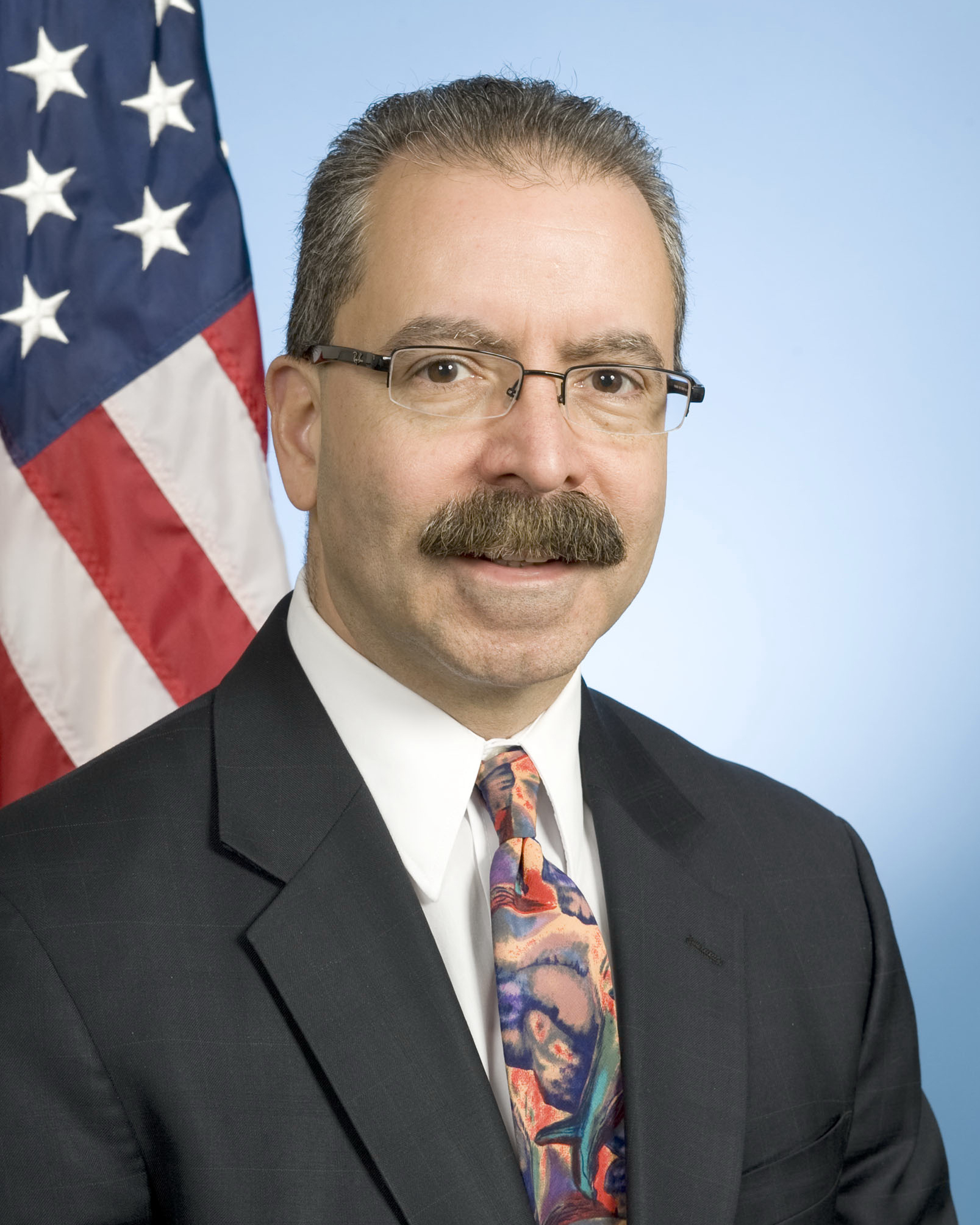
Orlando Figueroa

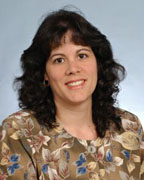
Amri Hernandez-Pellerano

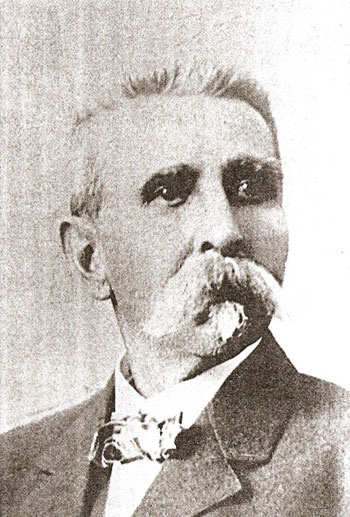
Fermín Tangüis

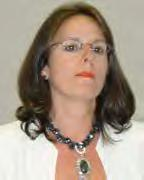
Miriam Rodon-Naveira

Before Christopher Columbus and the Spanish Conquistadors landed on the island of "Borikén" (Puerto Rico), the Taínos who inhabit the island depended on their astronomical observations for the cultivation of their crops.

In 1581, Juan Ponce de León II, the grandson of the Conquistador Juan Ponce de León, studied an eclipse and its effects on the island and was able to establish the exact geographical coordinates of San Juan with his observations.

During the 19th century the economies of many countries in the world suffered from the spread of crop failures. Puerto Rico, whose economy depended heavily on its agriculture, felt the effects of some of the crop diseases. Scientists such as Agustín Stahl, Fermín Tangüis and Fernando López Tuero conducted investigations and experiments in the fields of agriculture, botany, ethnology and zoology. The findings of their investigations helped Puerto Rico's agricultural industry.

With the advances in medical technologies and the coming of the Space Age of the 20th century, Puerto Ricans have expanded their horizons and have made many contributions in various scientific fields, among them the fields of aerospace and medicine.

There are many Puerto Rican scientists involved in the American space program at the National Aeronautics and Space Administration (NASA). According to an article written by Margarita Santori Lopez for the official newspaper of the University of Puerto Rico's Mayagüez Campus, "Prensa RUM", as of 2003, of the 115 Hispanics working at NASA's Goddard Space Flight Center in Maryland, 70 were Puerto Ricans or of Puerto Rican descent. According to a research conducted during the period of 1990 to 1998 by Puerto Rican scientists in science and technology, Puerto Rican scientific production was greater than in any other Caribbean country and the sixth largest in all of Latin America.

The following is a list of some of Puerto Rico's notable scientists and inventors with short profiles that include the scientific contributions, inventions and achievements in their respective fields. The list is not limited to people born in Puerto Rico, it also includes people who are of full or partial Puerto Rican ancestry, and many long-term residents and who have made Puerto Rico their home, and who are recognized for their life and/or work.

== Aerospace ==
- Roberto Alemán is an electronics engineer and Aero-Space Technologist at NASA Goddard Space Flight Center in Maryland. As Environmental Instruments Director, he directs everything that is related to the environmental instruments that the United States provides to the European Space Agency in order to operate the MetOp, a European satellite that provides environmental information to both Europe and the United States.
- Adán Rodríguez-Arroyo is an electronics engineer and Aero-Space Technologist at NASA Goddard Space Flight Center in Maryland. Rodríguez-Arroyo is the Communications System Lead Engineer for the Lunar Reconnaissance Orbiter (LRO) Mission, to be launched in 2008. He was in charge of the design of the communications systems of the "Global Precipitation Measurement" satellite.
- Anthony M. Busquets is an electronics engineer and Aero-Space Technologist at NASA Langley Research Center in Hampton, Virginia. He is involved in the development and application of multifunction control/display switch technology in 1983 and Development and application of a microprocessor-based I/O system for simulator use in 1984. He is the author and or co-author of over 13 conference papers and NASA formal publications in the areas of cockpit controls and displays, use of stereoscopy in flight displays and pictorial flight displays for situation awareness enhancement.
- Juan R. Cruz is an aerospace engineer and Aero Space Technologist at NASA Langley Research Center in Hampton, Virginia who helped design and qualification of the supersonic parachute for the Mars Exploration Rover (MER) project. Cruz is a senior aerospace engineer in the Exploration Systems Engineering Branch at the NASA Langley Research Center. His responsibilities are focused on research and development of entry, descent, and landing (EDL) systems for robotic and human exploration missions. He was a member of the highly successful Mars Exploration Rover (MER) project that placed two rovers on the surface of Mars in 2004. His contributions to the MER project were centered on the design and qualification of the supersonic parachute. Cruz is also a member of the Phoenix (Mars 2007), Mars Science Laboratory (Mars 2009), and Crew Exploration Vehicle EDL teams. He has undertaken research on advanced missions to Mars, including robotic airplanes, as well as having been a technical reviewer for the Genesis, Huygens, and Stardust missions. Prior to his involvement with exploration programs he conducted research on high-altitude unmanned aircraft.

External videos
- You may watch and listen to Orlando Figueroa recipient of the 2005 Service to America Medal here

- Orlando Figueroa is a mechanical engineer, Aero-Space Technologist and the former Director of Solar System Exploration Division and Mars Exploration at NASA Goddard Space Flight Center. Figueroa headed the cryogenic technology section, played a key role on the Cosmic Background Explorer mission, and managed a Space Shuttle Helium on Orbit Mission. He is the manager for the Small Explorers (SMEX) project, manager for the Explorers Program, and Director of Systems Technology and Advanced Concept Directorate. He is currently the Director, Applied Engineering & Technology at the NASA, Goddard Space Flight Center (as the "Director of Engineering" he manages the full scope of engineering activities at Goddard).

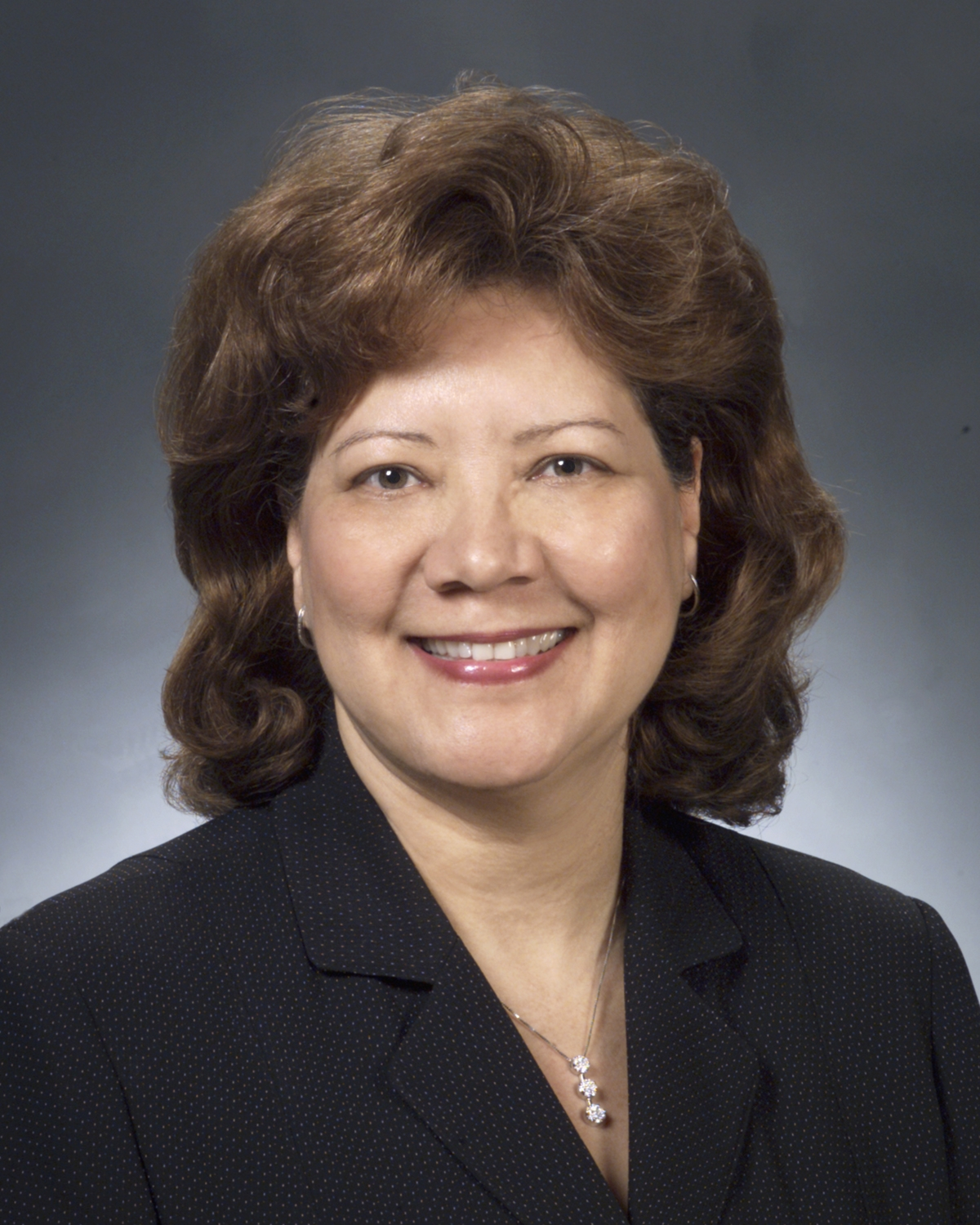
Olga D. Gonzalez-Sanabria

- Olga D. González-Sanabria is a scientist and inventor. She is the highest ranking Hispanic at NASA Glenn Research Center, and a member of the Ohio Women's Hall of Fame. As Director of the Engineering and Technical Services, she is responsible for planning and directing a full range of integrated services including engineering, fabrication, testing, facility management and aircraft services for the Glenn Research Center. She played an instrumental role in the development of the "Long Cycle-Life Nickel-Hydrogen Battery" that helps enable the International Space Station power system. Among the technical reports that she has authored and or co-authored are:
  1. Effect of NASA advanced designs on thermal behavior of Ni-H2 cells (1987)
  2. Component variations and their effects on bipolar nickel-hydrogen cell performance (1987)
  3. NASA Aerospace Flight Battery Systems Program – Issues and actions (1988)
  4. Effect of NASA advanced designs on thermal behavior of Ni-H2 cells 2 (1988)
  5. Energy storage considerations for a robotic Mars surface sampler (1989)

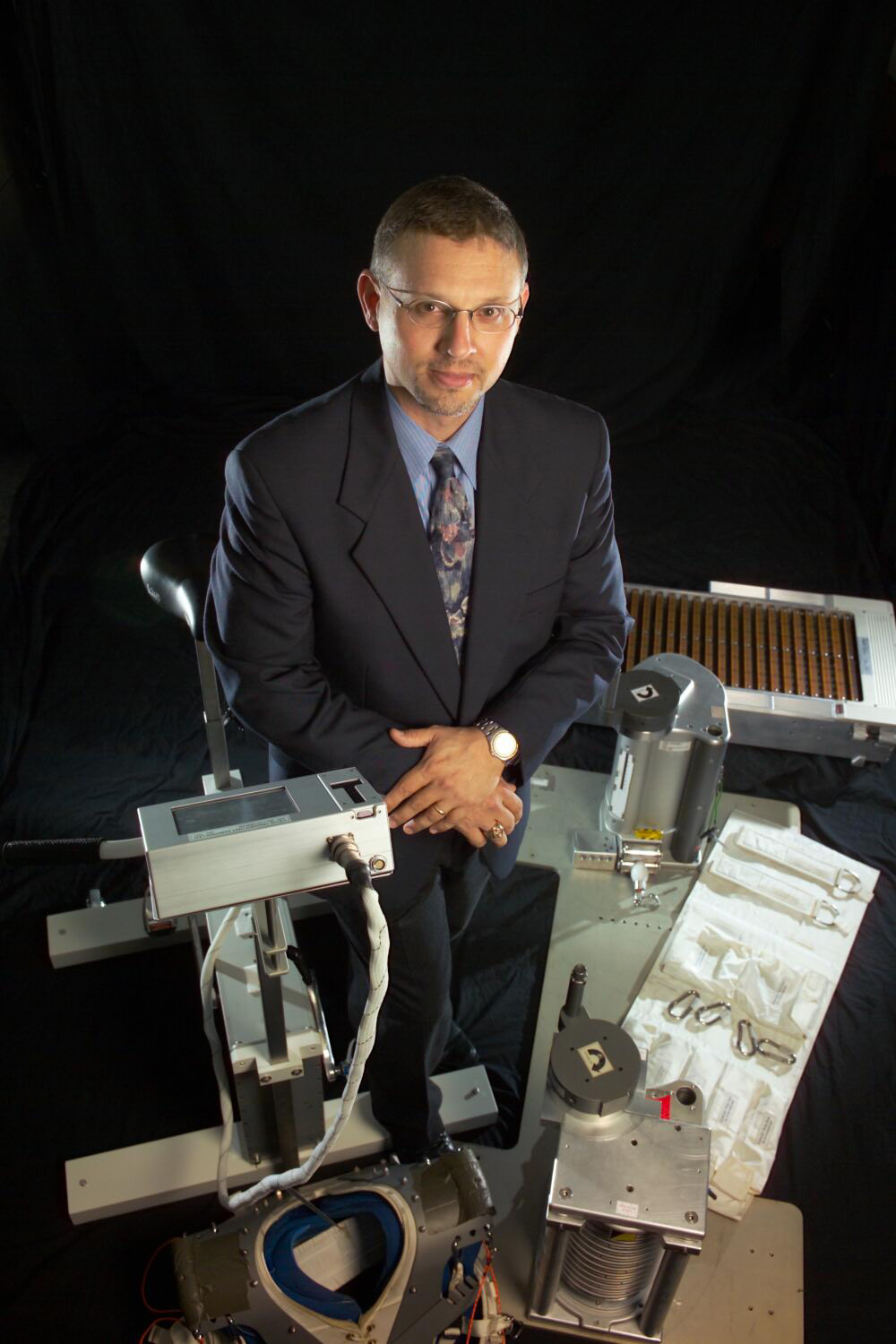
Carlos Ortiz Longo

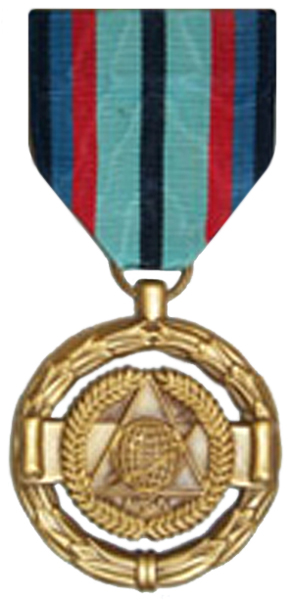
NASA Exceptional Achievement Medal

- Amri Hernández-Pellerano is an electronics engineer and scientist who designs, builds and tests the electronics that will regulate the solar array power in order to charge the spacecraft battery and distribute power to the different loads or users inside various spacecraft at NASA's Goddard Space Flight Center. She designed the power systems electronics for the WMAP mission. WMAP is a NASA Explorer mission satellite that measures the temperature of the cosmic background radiation over the full sky with unprecedented accuracy.
- Carlos Ortiz Longo (born August 18, 1962) is a Mechanical and Materials Science Engineer, Air Transport Pilot, and Flight Instructor. He is a retired NASA Johnson Space Center Engineer, and pilot. His expertise includes Thermal Analysis, Thermal Design, High Speed Atmospheric Thermal Protection Systems, Materials Engineering, Mechanical Behavior of High Temperature Structural Ceramics, Mechanical Testing of Materials, Structural Mechanics, Astronaut Crew Health Care Systems, Rocket Engine Testing, Project Management, and System Management. Ortiz Longo is currently an Airline Pilot for a major airline. Ortiz Longo reached finalist status in the Astronaut Selection program (top 4% of qualified applicants who are invited to the Johnson Space Center in Houston for final interviews), for Astronaut Candidate Class 16 in 1996. Ortiz Longo was awarded the NASA Exceptional Achievement Medal. To be awarded the medal, a NASA employee must make substantial contributions characterized by a substantial and significant improvement in operations, efficiency, service, financial savings, science, or technology that directly contribute to the mission of NASA For civilians, the decoration is typically bestowed to mid-level and senior NASA administrators who have supervised at least four to five successful NASA missions. Astronauts may be awarded the decoration after two to three space flights.
- Mercedes Reaves is a research engineer and scientist. She is responsible for the design of a viable full-scale solar sail and the development and testing of a scale model solar sail at NASA Langley Research Center. She must select and apply tools to analyze complex thin film structures characterized by wrinkling, geometric and material nonlinear behavior. She is also responsible for planning experimental studies to validate analytical techniques and study solar sails dynamics.
- Miriam Rodon-Naveira is a scientist and the first Hispanic woman to hold the Deputy Directorship for the Environmental Sciences Division within the National Exposure Research Laboratory. She is responsible for developing, coordinating and maintaining research and educational activities in support of NASA's Dryden Flight Research Center mission. She holds a doctorate in Biology–Aquatic Microbial Ecology.

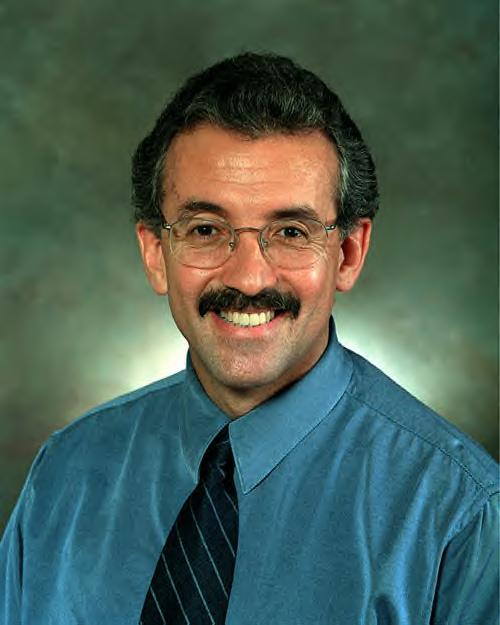
Pedro Rodriguez

- Pedro Rodríguez is a scientist, inventor, mechanical engineer, Aero-Space Technologist and the Director of a test laboratory at NASA. He invented a portable, battery-operated lift seat for people suffering from knee arthritis. Rodriguez was the leader of the Solid Rocket Booster accident investigation team following the Space Shuttle Columbia accident in February 2003 and was also the project manager for the Space Launch Initiative program. Rodriguez is currently the Director of the test laboratory in the Engineering Directorate at NASA's Marshall Space Flight Center. He is responsible for the engineering services and facilities for environmental, structural, and propulsion testing of NASA programs assigned to the Marshall Space Flight Center. Among his duties are: research, development, qualification, and acceptance testing of critical space and flight hardware, as well as the testing of relevant development hardware.

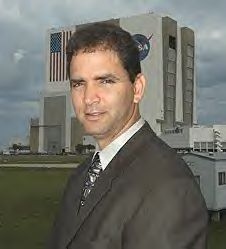
Felix Soto Toro

- Felix Soto Toro is a scientist, astronaut applicant and an electrical designs engineer in NASA, who developed the Advanced Payload Transfer Measurement System (ASPTMS)(Electronic 3D measuring system). At the Kennedy Space Center, Soto reviews, designs, builds, tests and implements engineering designs used in the Space Shuttle and Payload Operations Development Laboratories. The main project he developed was the Advanced Payload Transfer Measurement System (ASPTMS)(Electronic 3D measuring system), which consists of a simplified, robust, centrally operated and portable system that automatically measures the spherical coordinates offset between the trunnion and their supports during transfer operations. This system has the potential to become a NASA project with commercial applications. Soto earned his Doctorate of Philosophy degree in electrical engineering and has applied to become an astronaut candidate.

== Agriculture ==
In the 19th Century, Puerto Rico's economy depended on its agricultural industry. Among the products that Puerto Rico exported were tobacco, cotton, ginger, pineapples and citrus fruits. The two main agricultural products whose production dominated the island's economy were sugar and coffee.

- Coffee industry
  - In the 1860s, the Mariani family of Yauco created a machine out of a cotton gin that was used in the dehusking of coffee. This represented a significant improvement in Puerto Rico's coffee appearance and an opportunity to stand out in the international coffee market.
- Cotton industry

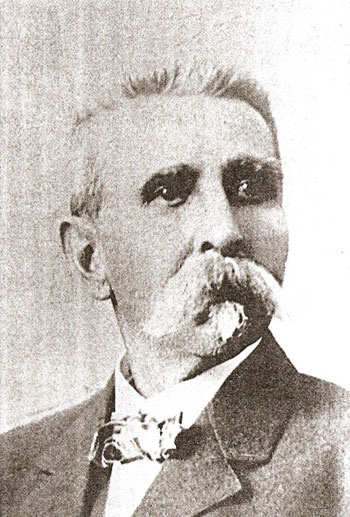
Fermín Tangüis

- Fermín Tangüis (1851–1930) was a Puerto Rican businessman, agriculturist and scientist who in 1901 developed the seed that would eventually produce the Tanguis cotton in Peru when that nation's cotton industry suffered because of a fungus plague caused by a plant disease known some places as "cotton wilt" and in others as "Fusarium wilt" (Fusarium vasinfectum) saving that nation's cotton industry. Tangüis began to study some species of the plant that were affected by the disease to a lesser extent and experimented in germination with the seeds of various cotton plants. In 1911, after 10 years of experimenting and failures, Tangüis was able to develop a seed that produced a superior cotton plant resistant to the disease. The seeds produced a plant that had a 40% longer (between 29 mm and 33 mm) and thicker fiber that did not break easily and required little water. The cotton grown in Peru (Egyptian cotton) before the fungus plague grew only once a year; the Tangüis cotton grows six times a year. This type of fiber showed a better resistance and performance than other fibers. Tangüis cotton grows in Canete's valley (south of Lima) and in the Central Coast of Peru. The success of the Tangüis cotton, which is also known in Peru as "Oro Blanco" (White Gold), saved the cotton industry of that nation.
- Coconut industry
- Ramón López Irizarry (1897–1982) was an educator and scientist who invented an easier way to extract the cream from the coconut pulp. He was a professor of agricultural sciences at the University of Puerto Rico in the late 1940s when the Government of Puerto Rico gave a grant to the University of Puerto Rico (Universidad de Puerto Rico) to help assist in the development of Puerto Rican industries. In 1949, Lopez-Irizarry, with the use of some of these funds, was able to work in his laboratory on an idea that he had. Lopez-Irizarry set out to find an easier way to extract the cream from the coconut pulp. The heart of the coconut has always been an important ingredient in many of the desserts in Puerto Rico. The main problem was extracting the coconut cream from the pulp, which was a difficult task. Lopez-Irizarry discovered an easier way by blending the cream from the hearts of the Caribbean coconuts with an exact proportion of natural cane sugar. He used his discovery in the development of "Coco Lopez", a coconut product that is used in many popular drinks.
- Sugar industry
- Fernando López Tuero was an agricultural scientist and agronomist who saved the sugar industry of Puerto Rico when he discovered the bug (believed at first to be a germ) that was destroying the island's sugar canes. In the latter part of the 19th Century, an epidemic was affecting the agricultural industry of Puerto Rico. Among the crops affected was the sugar cane, whose main product "sugar" was vital to Puerto Rico's economy. The Spanish colonial government, created an emergency commission composed of scientists, which included Agustín Stahl and Fernando López Tuero, to study the situation. Agustín Stahl concluded that the epidemic was caused by a "germ" in the terrain, however his findings were inconclusive. In 1894, Fernando López Tuero, who was the head agronomist of the Agronomical Station of Río Piedras, discovered that the cause of the epidemic was the white grub (Phyllophaga). Phyllophaga is a very large genus (more than 260 species) of New World scarab beetles in the subfamily Melolonthinae. These beetles are nocturnal, coming to lights in great numbers. The adults are chafers, feeding on foliage of trees and shrubs. They may cause significant damage when emerging in large numbers. The larvae (called white grubs) feed on the roots of grasses and other plants.

== Archaeology ==
- Ricardo Alegría is a scholar, cultural anthropologist and archeologist known as the "Father of Modern Puerto Rican Archaeology". He is credited with being a pioneer in the anthropology of the Taino culture and the African heritage in Puerto Rico. His extensive studies have helped historians to understand how the Taínos lived and suffered, before and after the Spanish Conquistadores arrived in the island. Alegría estimated that about one third of all Puerto Ricans (2 million out of 6 million) have Taíno blood and therefore the Taínos were not completely extinct and some had to survive. Recently, the results of recent DNA studies have proved him right.

== Astronomy ==
- Victor Manuel Blanco is an astronomer who, in 1959, discovered a Galactic Cluster "Blanco 1", which was named after him. Blanco was the second Director of the Cerro Tololo Inter-American Observatory in Chile, which has the largest 4-m telescope in the Southern Hemisphere, In 1995, the telescope was dedicated in his honor and is known as the Blanco 4m
- Sixto González was the first Puerto Rican to be named Director of the Arecibo Observatory, the world's largest single dish radio telescope. In 2001, Gonzalez was named assistant director for space and atmospheric sciences at the telescopic facility. On September 29, 2003, Gonzalez became the first Puerto Rican to be named Director of the observatory. The appointment was made by Robert Brown, director of the National Astronomy and Ionosphere Center (NAIC). Gonzalez was responsible for the overall management of the facility, including the executions of basic policy that maintains the observatory at the front of research in astronomy, planetary studies and atmospheric science. He stepped down as Director on September 15, 2006.

== Astrophysics ==
- Neil deGrasse Tyson is an astrophysicist and television and radio host. deGrasse Tyson, whose mother is Puerto Rican, is the director of the Hayden Planetarium in New York City. deGrasse Tyson is the host of the PBS series "Cosmos: A Personal Voyage".

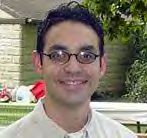
Enectali Figueroa

- Enectalí Figueroa-Feliciano is a mechanical engineer, Astronaut applicant and an Associate Professor of Physics at Northwestern University and the author of various papers including "Position-sensitive low-temperature detectors". Figueroa's research interests revolve around the development of high-energy-resolution imaging spectrometers for space-borne applications in experimental astrophysics and cosmology. Figueroa pioneered the development of position-sensitive detectors that will provide an order of magnitude more pixels (and thus larger field of view) than traditional single-pixel X-ray microcalorimeters." He is an expert and researcher on dark matter. and a researcher with the National Aeronautics and Space Administration (NASA) and a professor of physics Northwestern University.
- Adolfo Figueroa-Viñas is the first Puerto Rican astrophysicist at NASA working in solar plasma physics. As a senior research scientist, he is involved in many NASA missions, such as Wind, SOHO, Cluster and MMS projects, in which he is the author and co-author of numerous scientific papers in his field. Figueroa-Viñas has served as Guest Co-Investigator of the International Sun Earth Explorer (ISEE-1) mission and the Voyagers program. He is currently a Co-Investigator in the WIND/SWE experiment of the International Solar Terrestrial Program (ISTP) and the Space Physics Theory Program grant entitled The Role of Turbulence in Heliospheric Plasmas. Viñas has participated in the organizing committee of "La Conferencia Espacial de las Américas" held in Costa Rica, Chile and Uruguay. He is the recipient of the NASA Special Service Award.

== Biochemistry ==
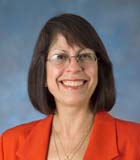
Nitza Margarita Cintron

- Nitza Margarita Cintrón is a scientist who originated the Biochemistry Laboratory at the Johnson Space Center. She is the Chief of Space Medicine and Health Care Systems Office at NASA's Johnson Space Center. In 1979, Cintron originated the Biochemistry Laboratory at the Johnson Space Center. He served from 1979 to 1985 as the project scientist for the Space Lab 2 mission, which was launched in 1985 aboard the Space Shuttle Challenger. In 2004, she was named "Chief of NASA's (JSC) Space Medicine and Health Care Systems Office", the position that she currently holds.

== Botany ==
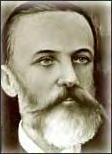
Agustin Stahl

- Agustín Stahl (1842–1917) conducted investigations and experiments in the fields of botany, ethnology and zoology. Stahl wrote "Estudios sobre la flora de Puerto Rico" (A study of the Puerto Rican Flora), published in six fascicles from 1883 to 1888. Copies of his plant collection with approximately 1,330 plants can be found in various botanical gardens around the world. His collections were the basis for numerous studies by specialists, some of them resulting in new taxa to science. He has a genus, Stahlia, and five valid species, Argythamnia stahlii, Senna pendula var. stahlii , Eugenia stahlii, Lyonia stahlii, and Ternstroemia stahlii, named in his honor. The genus Stahlia is represented by a single species, S. monosperma (Tul.) Urb., known to occur only in Puerto Rico and the eastern Dominican Republic. Known in Puerto Rico as Cóbana Negra, this species is currently listed as threatened in the USFW Federal Register, April 5, 1990.

== Chemistry education ==
- Ingrid Montes is a professor in the Department of Chemistry at the University of Puerto Rico, Río Piedras campus. She attained tenure in 1998. Her research focus is on chemical education and organometallic chemistry.Montes has been Director-at-large at the American Chemical Society (ACS) since 2013. Montes founded the "Festival de Química" (Chemistry Festival) in 2005. The "Festival de Quimica" is a community outreach program created to engage the general public through chemistry demonstrations and its relation to daily life. This program was then adopted by the ACS in 2010 and in 2016, the ACS festival training was launched around the world.

== Climate change ==
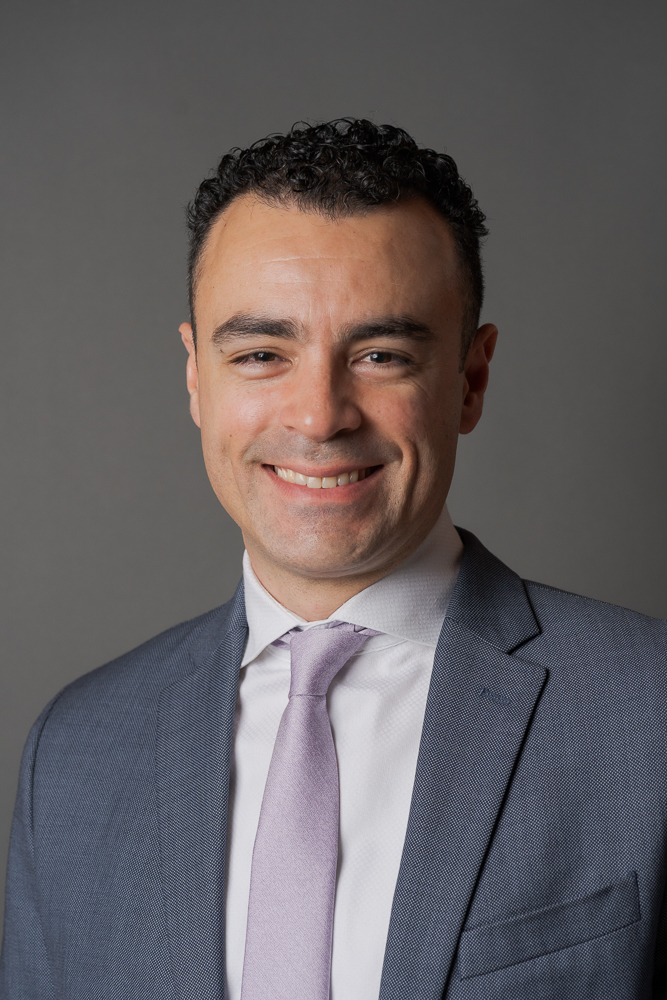
Miguel O. Román

External videos
- You may listen Miguel Román describe his work at Leidos and NASA here

- Miguel Román, serves as Chief Climate Scientist and Technical Fellow at Leidos. A leading expert in the fields of satellite remote sensing, climate change, disaster risk reduction, and sustainability, Román has championed translational research and data-intensive approaches to assess and address climate-related risks. His work is internationally recognized for shedding light on the disproportionate hardships experienced by socially-vulnerable and underserved communities following major disasters. In 2022, Román was named the team leader of the Moderate Resolution Imaging Spectroradiometer (MODIS) science team for NASA's Terra and Aqua missions. Román also serves as the land discipline leader for the Suomi-NPP and NOAA-20 Visible Infrared Imaging Radiometer Suite (VIIRS) science team, a worldwide group of investigators and technical staff in charge of one of the largest and most comprehensive polar-orbiting satellite systems operated by NASA and NOAA to monitor our planet's vital signs.

== Ecology ==
- Ariel Lugo is a scientist, ecologist and Director of the International Institute of Tropical Forestry within the United States Department of Agriculture Forest Service, based in Puerto Rico. He is a founding Member of the Society for Ecological Restoration and Member-at-Large of the Board of the Ecological Society of America. His current research is focused on assessments of the role of tropical forests in global processes and comparisons between tropical tree plantations and natural forests. He has over 300 publications in scientific journals and books and has served on federal interagency committees and frequently required to appear as an expert witness in federal court in cases considering environmental issues. He currently serves on the Editorial Boards of Conservation Ecology, Mitigation and Adaptation Strategies for Global Change, Forest Ecology and Management, Restoration Ecology, Journal of Sustainable Forestry, Acta Cientifica (Editor) and Journal of the Littoral.

== Hydrometeorology ==
- Rafael L. Bras is an engineer and expert in hydrometeorology and global warming. As an engineering hydrologist, his major areas of interest include land-atmosphere interactions and geomorphology. He is considered one of the world's leading experts in global warming, and has also served as a professional consultant in multiple projects around the world. Bras has specialized in the interpretation of natural phenomena as random functions. He has been recognized for his use of modern probabilistic methods in the design of networks to monitor rainfall and river flow, and in rainfall and river discharge forecasting. Presently his interests span the areas of fluvial geomorphology and hydroclimatology.

== Marine biology ==
- Pablo Clemente-Colon is the first Puerto Rican to serve as Chief Scientist of the National Ice Center (NIC), headquartered in Alexandria Virginia, a position he has held since 2005. As such, he serves the three entities that operate the NIC, the United States Navy, the National Oceanic and Atmospheric Administration (NOAA) and the United States Coast Guard.
- Carlos Del Castillo was the Program Scientist for the Ocean Biology and Biogeochemistry Program at NASA Headquarters, in Washington, D.C. Del Castillo is the recipient of the Presidential Early Career Award for Scientists and Engineers (PECASE) award, the highest honor bestowed by the United States government on scientists and engineers beginning their independent careers. He began working in the Mississippi River plume and in the application of remote sensors to study coastal environments. He co-edited with Richard Miller and Brent McKee, Remote Sensing of the Coastal Environment, a book that provides extensive insight on remote sensing of coastal waters from aircraft and space-based platforms
- Antonio A. Mignucci-Giannoni is a biological oceanographer specializing in the biology, management and conservation of marine mammals. He is the founder of the international conservation organization Red Caribeña de Varamientos (Caribbean Stranding Network) dedicated to the care, treatment, and rehabilitation of injured or stranded marine mammals, sea turtle and sea birds. As a scientist, Mignucci is an expert in endangered tropical marine mammals and a specialist in the West Indian manatee.

== Medicine ==
- José Ramón Alcalá (born 1940) is an anatomist who, in 1972, was appointed assistant professor in the Wayne School of Medicine. There he conducted research that would make him the foremost expert on cell makeup of the human eye lens. Alcalá developed laboratory methods to study the histology of ocular tissue, which ultimately helped to explain the development of cataracts, among other maladies of the eye
- Gualberto Ruaño is a pioneer in the field of personalized medicine and the inventor of molecular diagnostic systems, Coupled Amplification and Sequencing (CAS) System (U.S. patent 5,427,911), used worldwide for the management of viral diseases. Ruaño is president and Founder of Genomas, a genetics-related company and now the bio-tech anchor of Hartford Hospital's Genetic Research Center; he also serves as Director of genetics research at the Center

Cardiology

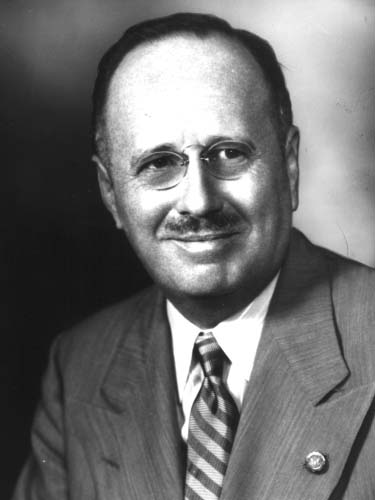
Antonio Fernós-Isern

- Antonio Fernós-Isern (1895–1974) was the first Puerto Rican cardiologist and its longest serving resident commissioner. From 1919 to 1921, he was the Under-Secretary of Health; from 1921 to 1923 the Director of Health in city; from 1923 to 1929 he was once again Under-Secretary of Health and from 1930 to 1933 the Secretary of Health of Puerto Rico. In 1933, Fernos-Isern resigned as health commissioner and went to New York, where he completed his residency in cardiology at Columbia University and thus became the "first" Puerto Rican cardiologist. He returned to Puerto Rico and became a professor at the "School of Tropical Medicine of Puerto Rico", where he had previously served as assistant and associate professor.
- Ramón M. Suárez Calderon (1895–1981) was a cardiologist and scientist whose investigations led him to identify the proper and effective treatment of a type of anemia known as Tropical Espru, the application of complex methods, such as electrocardiography and radioisotope, to be used in clinics and the identification and treatment of the disease that causes heart rheumatism.

Embryology Endocrinology

- Pedro Beauchamp is the first Puerto Rican specialist certified by the American Reproductive Endocrinology and Infertility Board who in 1985 performed the first in vitro fertilization (IVF) technique in Puerto Rico. In 1982, Beauchamp was responsible and is credited with delivering the first triplets born by in-vitro fertilization in the United States and the first in-vitro baby born in Argentina. His work is known as GIFT (in vitro fertilization and embryo transfer) and TET (Tubal Embryo Transfer). Beauchamp returned to Puerto Rico in 1985 and established his practice in reproductive endocrinology and infertility in the city of Bayamón. In 1986, he delivered the first child born from the in-vitro fertilization procedure in all of Puerto Rico at the Regional Hospital of Bayamón.

Immunology

- Angel M. Marchand a Case Western-trained physician and one of the first Puerto Rican doctors board-certified in allergy and immunology, dedicated his life to researching tropical allergies and developing vaccines that would effectively prevent or minimize allergic reactions to substances prevalent in tropical environments in Puerto Rico, the Caribbean and other tropical areas of the world.

Nephrology

- Manuel Martínez Maldonado a nephrologist, is the executive vice president for research at the University of Louisville. Martínez-Maldonado has authored numerous scientific publications. His research interests are the regulation of blood pressure and the effect of high blood pressure on the kidneys. He also focuses on the renin angiotensin system, a hormone system that helps regulate long-term blood pressure and blood volume in the body and is controlled primarily by the kidneys.

Odontology

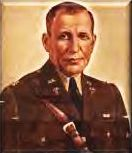
Major Fernando E. Rodríguez Vargas

- Fernando E. Rodríguez Vargas (1888–1932) was an odontologist (dentist), scientist and a Major in the U.S. Army who discovered the bacteria that causes dental caries. Rodríguez Vargas was assigned to the Army Dental Corps as an educator and investigator of the bacteriological aspects of dental diseases. His research led him to discover the bacteria that causes dental caries. According to his investigations, three types of the Lactobacillus species, during the process of fermentation, are the causes of cavities. In December 1922, he published an original and fundamental work on the specific bacteriology of dental caries. His findings were published in the December issue of the Military Dental Journal titled "The Specific Study of the Bacteriology of Dental Cavities". Rodríguez Vargas also developed the techniques and methods of analysis. On September 28, 1928, Rodriguez Vargas published in the "Journal of the American Medical Association" his findings in the effectiveness of Iodine and other chemical agents as disinfectants of the mucous membranes of the mouth. Since then, other scientists have used the findings of his investigations as the basis in the study of the bacteriology of dental caries.

Oncology

- Isaac González Martínez (1871–1954) was one of the first urologist in Puerto Rico and pioneer in the fight against cancer in the island. González Martínez conducted many investigations and experiments in parasitology, bilharzia, leprosy and typhoid fever. González Martínez and Bailey K. Ashford formed the first commission in Puerto Rico to study the causes of anemia. In 1914, he was named director of the biological laboratory of the sanitation service of Puerto Rico. In 1935, González Martínez founded The Puerto Rican League against Cancer. He also promoted the construction of Puerto Rico's first hospital specializing in oncology.

Organ transplantation

- Iván González Cancel is a cardiovascular and thoracic surgeon who is credited with the realization of the first heart transplant in Puerto Rico. He participated in his first heart transplant at the University of Pittsburgh. González Cancel returned to Puerto Rico in 1993 and was named Director of the Department of Surgery of the Cardiovascular Center of Puerto Rico and the Caribbean (Centro Cardiovascular de Puerto Rico y el Caribe). González Cancel implemented a cardiovascular program in the institution and on June 27, 1999, with the help of Hector Banchs Pieretti performed the first heart transplant in Puerto Rico.
- Diego R. Solís is the founder and director of the "Centro de Cirugias de Higado y Pancreas" (Liver and Pancreas Surgery Center), performed the first simultaneous pancreas and kidney transplant in Puerto Rico. On March 9, 2007, Solís performed, in the "Hospital Auxilio Mutuo" (Mutual Aid Hospital), the first simultaneous pancreas and kidney transplant in Puerto Rico, a procedure that lasted eight hours. Solís, who is also the director of the pancreas transplant program of said institution, has made numerous scientific investigations in the field of hepatobiliar surgery with a special interest in the causes and treatment of advanced tumors of the liver.
- Eduardo Santiago Delpín is a surgeon who wrote the first book in Spanish about organ transplants. Santiago Delpin is the founder of the Latin American Transplant Register, The Pan-American Society of Dialysis and Transplants, plus the Latin American and Caribbean Society of Transplants. He is a professor of surgery at the University of Puerto Rico and program director of transplantation of organs of the "Hospital Auxilio Mutuo" (Mutual Aid Hospital). His book, Organ transplantation, the first to be published in Spanish on the topic, won the Prize of Graphic Arts in Mexico and sold out in a year and a half. It covers the history of transplants in different countries, their conditions and their effects religious, ethical, psychological and cultural aspects in addition to considering immunological and clinical procedure. The book now is in its second edition.

Pediatrics

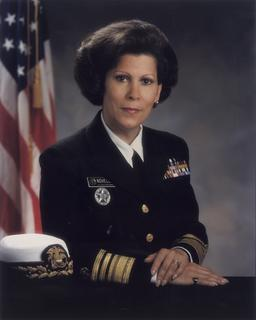
Antonia Novello

- Antonia Coello Novello is a pediatrician who served as the 14th Surgeon General of the United States from 1990 to 1993. In 1978, Novello joined and received a commission in the Public Health Service Commissioned Corps (PHSCC) rising all the way up to flag officer/medical director grade. Her first assignment being as a project officer at the National Institute of Arthritis, Metabolism and Digestive Diseases of the National Institutes of Health (NIH). She held various positions at NIH, rising to the medical director/flag rank in the PHSCC and to the job of deputy director of the National Institute of Child Health and Human Development (NICHD) in 1986. She also served as Coordinator for AIDS Research for NICHD from September 1987. In this role, she developed a particular interest in pediatric AIDS. Novello made major contributions to the drafting and enactment of the Organ Transplantation Procurement Act of 1984 while assigned to the United States Senate Committee on Labor and Human Resources, working with the staff of committee chairman Orrin Hatch. She was the first woman and the first Hispanic (Puerto Rican) to hold the position of Surgeon General.
- Milagros (Mili) J. Cordero is a licensed, registered occupational therapist with board certification in Pediatrics. She is the founder and President of ITT'S for Children, a professional group that assists and empowers parents to develop a better understanding of the strengths and needs of their children and to enhance their children's development to the full extent of their capability. Cordero is certified in the use of SAMONAS and Tomatis sound therapies. She is a member of the national DIR Institute faculty and serves as vice-chair to Georgia's State Interagency Coordinating Council for the Babies Can't Wait Program, the professional advisory council of the National Cornelia De Lange Association, and the board of the Frazer Center in Atlanta, Georgia.

Public health

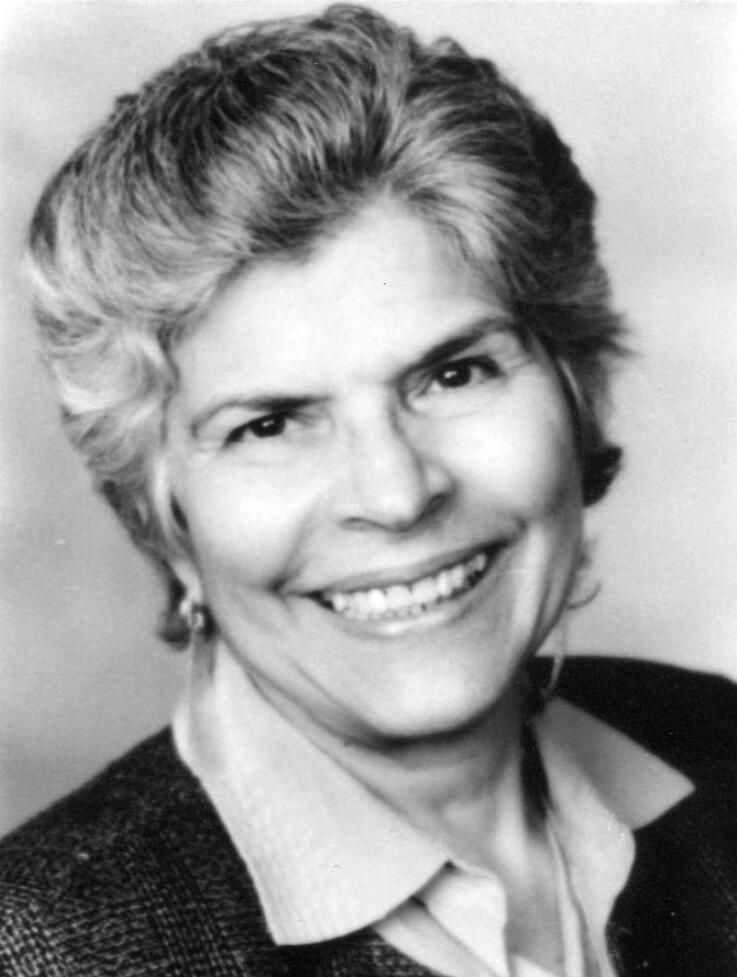
Dr. Helen Rodriguez-Trias

- Helen Rodríguez-Trías was a pediatrician and activist. She was the first Latina president of The American Public Health Association, a founding member of the Women's Caucus of the American Public Health Association and the recipient of the Presidential Citizen's Medal. She testified before the Department of Health, Education, and Welfare for passage of federal sterilization guidelines. The guidelines, which she drafted, require a woman's written consent to sterilization, offered in a language they can understand, and set a waiting period between the consent and the sterilization procedure. She is credited with helping to expand the range of public health services for women and children in minority and low-income populations in the United States, Central and South America, Africa, Asia, and the Middle East.

Teratology

- José F. Cordero is a pediatrician, epidemiologist, teratologist and Dean of the Graduate School of Public Health at the University of Puerto Rico. Cordero was an Assistant Surgeon General of the United States Public Health Service and the Founding Director of the National Center on Birth Defects and Developmental Disabilities (NCBDDD) at the Centers for Disease Control and Prevention (CDC) in Atlanta, Georgia. In 1994, Cordero was appointed deputy director of the National Immunization Program, where he made important and long-lasting contributions in many areas of one of the nation's most successful public health programs. In 2001, he was named the first director of the NCBDDD that was created by the Children's Health Act of 2000. In a few years, NCBDDD became a leading international institution devoted to research and prevention of birth defects and developmental disabilities and health promotion of people of ages living with disabilities. Cordero, whose work has been published in many national and international journals, has promoted the eradication of rubella (German measles), a major cause of birth defects that can be prevented through vaccination. He has also promoted research to determine the causes of birth defects and developmental disabilities, and has promoted efforts to prevent serious birth defects (such as use of folic acid to prevent spina bifida). He is a strong supporter of programs that promote wellness of persons with disabilities. In 2017, Cordero was awarded the Sedgwick Memorial Medal from the American Public Health Association.

== Microbiology ==
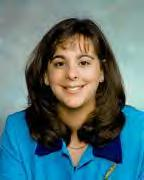
Monserrate Roman

- Monserrate Román is a scientist in NASA who helped NASA build part of the International Space Station. She is the Chief Microbiologist for the Environmental Control and Life Support System project who determines how microbes will behave under different situations and in different locations, such as the nooks and crannies of the Space Station. Roman was a member of the team that built the International Space Station. The Station was designed with materials that are microbe-resistant. Temperature and humidity are controlled to discourage microbe growth. Roman must study an international, multicultural group of the microbes, since crewmembers, visitors, experiments and hardware hail from 15 Station partner countries and comes with his or her own unique set of microbes.

== Mycology ==
- Carlos E. Chardón (1897–1965) a.k.a. the "Father of Mycology in Puerto Rico" Chardón is the first Puerto Rican mycologist. In 1922, he discovered the aphid "Aphis maidis", the vector of the mosaic of sugar cane. He was also the first Puerto Rican to hold the position of Chancellor of the University of Puerto Rico. Chardón was involved in the organization of the Puerto Rico Reconstruction Administration (PRRA) and initiated a project known as the Plan Chardón, which involved a plan for the development of Agriculture Technicians.

== Nanotechnology ==
External videos
- You may watch and listen to Dr. Yajaira Sierra Sastre during an interview here

- Yajaira Sierra Sastre was chosen to take part in a new NASA project, called "HI-SEAS", an acronym for "Hawaii Space Exploration Analog and Simulation", that will help to determine why astronauts do not eat enough, having noted that they get bored with spaceship food and end up with problems like weight loss and lethargy that put their health at risk. She lived for four months (March 2013 – August 2013) isolated in a planetary module, which simulated what life will be like for astronauts at a future base on Mars at a base, in Hawaii. According to Sierra Sastre part of the food study will include an attempt to control the exposure to fresh air, evaluate how their senses of smell and taste change over time in isolation, and find out what role food plays in the crew's spirits and state of mind. Sierra Sastre is an aspiring astronaut.

== Physics ==
- Mayda Velasco is a professor of physics at Northwestern University. Her research is centered in particle physics. She plays a leadership role in the CMS experiment at the CERN LHC. She is currently the director of the Colegio de Física Fundamental e Interdiciplinaria de las Américas (COFI) located in San Juan, Puerto Rico.

== Psychology ==
- Carlos Albizu Miranda (1920–1984) was one of the first Hispanics to earn a PhD in Psychology in the United States and the first Hispanic educator to have a North American University renamed in his honor. Albizu Miranda, cousin of the Puerto Rican Nationalist leader Pedro Albizu Campos, was born in Ponce. In 1953, he earned his doctorate degree (PhD) in Clinical Psychology from Purdue University, located in West Lafayette, Indiana, becoming one of the first Hispanics to earn a PhD in Psychology in the United States. He was concerned that the universities in Puerto Rico did not offer graduate programs in psychology and that the few students who pursued a career as psychologist had to study outside of Puerto Rico, where they were trained with models and techniques that were not always sensitive to the needs and sociocultural characteristics of Hispanic clients. In 1966, he established in San Juan, Puerto Rico, the first independent professional school of psychology in North America, initially known as the "Instituto Psicológico de Puerto Rico" (Puerto Rican Institute of Psychology), which is modeled after the institutes of psychology in Europe where the practice and internship are done at the same time. The American Psychological Foundation Awards for 1980 presented Albizu Miranda with the "Award for the Development of Psychology Education in Puerto Rico and the Caribbean". On January 1, 2000, the Board of Trustees of the Caribbean Center for Advanced Studies, which includes the Miami Institute of Psychology, renamed the two-campus institution "Carlos Albizu University".
- Joseph O. Prewitt Díaz a humanitarian psychologist developed the psychosocial support program within the American Red Cross, used in Central and South America as well as the 2001 Gujarat earthquake and the South Asia tsunami response and reconstruction, considered the leader of the second generation of humanitarian psychology, who systematized the staff development process of psychosocial responders for Central and South America as well as South Asian countries. A native of Cayey, Puerto Rico he was the recipient of the 2008 APA International Humanitarian Award. as well as the Kellogg Foundation National Fellowship in 1983–1985, and the participated in the 1986 Woodrow Wilson Hispanic Leadership Fellows Program at Princeton University.

== Physiology ==
- María Cordero Hardy, born in San Juan, Puerto Rico, is a physiologist. Physiology is the study of life, specifically, how cells, tissues, and organisms function. She is a scientist who did her research on vitamin E. Her work helped other scientists understand about how vitamin E works in the human body. She is now a professor at Louisiana State University and teaches students how to be medical technologists. A medical technologist is a person who studies your blood and other body fluids in the human body.

== Rocket scientist ==
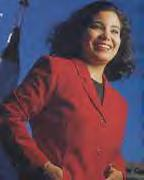
Lissette Martinez

- Lissette Martinez is an electrical engineer and rocket scientist. Martinez is the lead electrical engineer for the Space Experiment Module program at the Wallops Flight Facility, located in Virginia, which is part of NASA's Goddard Flight Facility. She is responsible for providing electrical engineering support to Code 870 Space Experiment Module (SEM) program. She also is responsible for the testing of ground and flight hardware. Martinez works with students around the world, helping them with science experiments that will actually ride along on Space Shuttle missions and blast into space. Martinez was a member of the team that launched a rocket from White Sands, New Mexico in 1999 to gather information on the Hale–Bopp Comet. She was featured in the November 2002 issue of Latina magazine.

== Space exploration ==
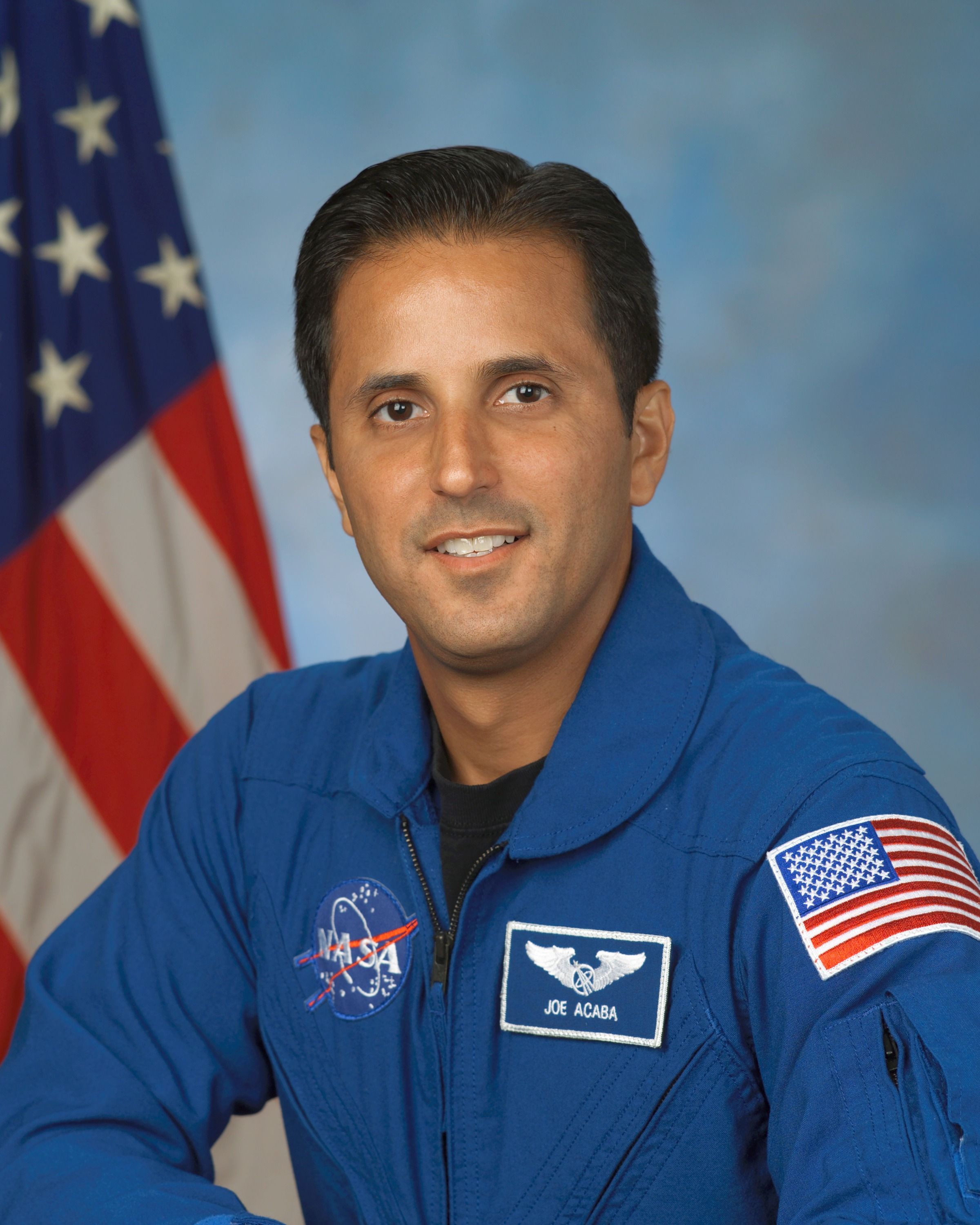
Joseph Acaba

External videos
- You may watch and listen to Joseph Michael "Joe" Acaba and Suni Williams aboard the International Space Station during a Space Station Social Media Event aboard the International Space Station here

- Joseph M. Acaba is a teacher, hydrogeologist, and the first Puerto Rican NASA astronaut. In May 2004 he became the first person of Puerto Rican heritage to be named as a NASA astronaut candidate when he was selected as a member of NASA Astronaut Training Group 19. He completed his training on February 10, 2006, and is currently assigned to STS-119, which launched on March 15, 2009, to deliver the final set of solar arrays to the International Space Station. Acaba carried a Puerto Rican Flag aboard the Space Shuttle Discovery during his flight.

== Space physics ==
- Ramón E. López is a space physicist and author, played an instrumental role in the implementation of a hands-on science program in elementary and middle grades Montgomery County Public Schools (MCPS) in Maryland. Lopez, who leads a research group that is working in both space physics and science education, is the co-author of a book on space weather entitled Storms from the Sun, which discusses the magnetic properties of the sun and solar wind and how these effect the magnetosphere of earth. Lopez is the 2002 recipient of the Nicholson Medal for Human Outreach, which recognizes the humanitarian aspect of physics and physicists.

== Zoology ==
- Juan A. Rivero was a scientist and zoologist who discovered over a hundred animal species and founded the Dr. Juan A. Rivero Zoo at the University of Puerto Rico at Mayagüez. Rivero served as an assistant plant physiologist, instructor, assistant professor and associate professor before becoming a full professor of biology at UPR at Mayagüez in 1958. After founding the institution's zoo in 1954, he served as its first director, as well as founder and director of the UPR's Institute of Marine Biology. From 1959 to 1960 he served as director of the biology department and from 1962 to 1966, as dean of arts and sciences, oversaw the work of over 200 faculty members and a two million-dollar annual budget. Between 1966 and 1968, he served as a research associate at Harvard University and visiting scientist at the Venezuelan Institute of Scientific Investigation. Rivero discovered over a hundred animal species, particularly amphibians and reptiles, many of which were named in his honor, and has written over 200 papers and articles and numerous books.

== Inventors ==
Puerto Rican inventors earned an average of sixteen patents per year in the late 1970s, twenty patents per year in the 1980s, and twenty-seven patents per year in the 199s. The total number of patents issued by the U.S. Patent Office has seen similar increases.

=== Aerospace ===
- Olga D. González-Sanabria contributed to the development of the "Long Cycle-Life Nickel-Hydrogen Battery" that helps enable the International Space Station power system; Mercedes Reaves contributed to the design of a viable full-scale solar sail and the development and testing of a scale model solar sail; Pedro Rodriguez invented a portable, battery-operated lift seat for people suffering from knee arthritis; Felix Soto Toro developed the Advanced Payload Transfer Measurement System (ASPTMS) (Electronic 3D measuring system) and Juan R. Cruz contributed in the development of entry, descent, and landing (EDL) systems for robotic and human exploration missions.

=== Art ===
- Ileana Sánchez invented a book for the blind that brings together art and braille. Ms. Sanchez used a new technique called TechnoPrint and TechnoBraille. Rather than punch through heavy paper to create the raised dots of the Braille alphabet for the blind, these techniques apply an epoxy to the page to create not only raised dots, but raised images with texture. The epoxy melds with the page, becoming part of it, so that one cannot scrape it off with a fingernail. The images are raised so that a blind person can feel the artwork and in color, not just to attract the sighted family who will read the book with blind siblings or children, but also for the blind themselves. The book Art & the Alphabet, A Tactile Experience is co-written with Rebecca McGinnis of the Metropolitan Museum of Art. The Met has already incorporated the book into their Access program.

=== Engineering ===
- William G. Pagán is an IBM-recognized Master Inventor, a member of the North Carolina State University Computer Science Alumni Hall of Fame, and award-winning Patent Attorney. He received a BS in Computer Science from Pace University, a Masters in Computer Science from North Carolina State University, and graduated Summa Cum Laude with his Juris Doctor from North Carolina Central University School of Law as their evening class valedictorian. As of January 1, 2019, he has been awarded over 85 U.S. patents, and is an inventor on over 130 U.S. patent applications. His patent portfolio generally covers a wide range of software methodologies for improving computer systems management, application usability, and data resiliency, among other things. He was born in New York City, New York, and worked at IBM's Research Triangle Park campus in North Carolina for nearly fifteen years. In 2010, he was declared Inventor of the Year of IBM's RTP site, beating out approximately 14,000 other IBM employees. In 2007 he was awarded a Luminary Award by HENAAC (now Great Minds in STEM) for excellence in engineering, and a Star Award by the DMTF for leadership in their industry standards working groups. In 2010, IBM recognized him with an Outstanding Technical Achievement Award for his work related to integrating the hardware-firmware-software stack of their line of Thurley-chipset servers. He is a life member of both the Society of Hispanic Professional Engineers and the North Carolina Society of Hispanic Professionals.
- Asdrubal García Ortíz was born in Santurce, Puerto Rico. He received a BS degree in electrical engineering (magna cum laude) from the University of Puerto Rico – Mayagüez, and an MS degree in systems science and mathematics from the McKelvey School of Engineering at Washington University in St. Louis. He began his engineering career as a technology engineer for McDonnell Douglas Astronautics Co., and is now an engineering staff scientist for DRS – Support Systems Inc. He has been awarded 16 U.S. Patents, is the author of 36 technical publications, and editor of 2 special issues of the international journal Mathematical and Computer Modelling, both on intelligent transportation systems. Together with fellow inventors Sunggyu Lee and John R. Wootton, Garcia Ortiz was granted various patents. A sample of these patents includes: US Patent No 6,177,885, "System and method for detecting traffic anomalies", US Patent No 7,186,345, "Systems for water purification through supercritical oxidation", and US Patent No 7,688,605, "Systems and methods for reducing the magnitude of harmonics produced by a power inverter". His areas of specialty are systems engineering, control systems, embedded systems and electronics. He is a registered Professional Engineer, a Senior Member of the Institute of Electrical and Electronics Engineers (IEEE), and a member of the International Council on Systems Engineering (INCOSE).

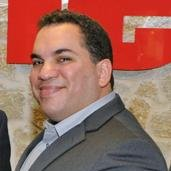
Dr. Ricardo Rodriguez Moreno

- Ricardo J. Rodriguez Moreno is a Raytheon and Great Minds in STEM recognized inventor, R6S Certified Expert, and Engineering Fellow. He received a BS and MS in Computer Engineering from University of Puerto Rico, and a Ph.D. with a Cybersecurity specialization from Nova Southeastern University College of Engineering and Computing. As of August 2016, he has been awarded 6 U.S. patents. He also holds a number of national and international patent pending inventions. He is also a frequent presenter and mentor to colleagues as well as college students, in particular in his alma mater "El Colegio" where he is cofounder and industry chair on the annual Engineering Community Summit (ECoS). He was born in San Juan Puerto Rico, raised in Carolina, and currently lives in Massachusetts, USA. Ricky Rodriguez joined Raytheon in 2001 after a short stint with Accenture. In 2010, Ricardo was awarded the Great Minds in STEM Information Technology Distinction Award for his contributions to the state of the art in Cybersecurity. Additional awards include Raytheon Authors and Inventors, Excellence in Technology, and two Science and Technology Achievement Recognition (STAR) awards, among others.

=== Electronics ===
Hydroelectric Wave-Energy Conversion System

- Jorge Negrón Crespo of San Juan, Puerto Rico, has invented a hydroelectric wave-energy conversion system. According to the U.S. Patent & Trademark Office: "A method and system to capture kinetic energy of the sea waves and convert it to electrical power is presented. The hydrodynamic power of the waves is converted to mechanical power after impacting and moving a special panel. The mechanical power is converted into a controlled-cycle hydraulic power to activate a hydraulic motor, which in turn activates an electrical generator."

Semiconductors

- David O. Ramos of Isabela, and Martin Bresciani of Guaynabo, developed a semiconductor substrate that includes electronic circuitry and has a machined feature formed therein. According to the U.S. Patent & Trademark Office: "A semiconductor substrate is formed by a process which includes providing the semiconductor substrate having the electronic circuitry formed therein, and performing a machining process on the substrate to form the machined feature therein."

=== Medical technology ===
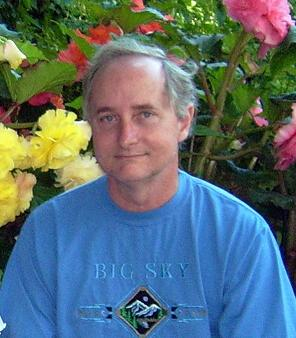
Jorge N. Amely-Velez

- Jorge N. Amely Vélez (born 1955) – a native of San German, is an inventor who holds various patents in the field of medical technology. In 1989, Amely Vélez earned his master's degree in electrical engineering from California State University at Northridge. Among Amely Vélez's inventions are two that involve the methods and apparatuses for timing events within an implantable medical device capable of performing many concurrent processes. He authored a method to help prevent defibrillator output stage short circuit failures in implantable devices. Amely Vélez invented methods for a microprocessor based implantable device to have a configurable memory to assist in software development and patching "Read Only Memory" (ROM) based systems. He coauthored inventions in the field of rechargeable lithium silver vanadium oxide batteries for implantable devices and holds a patent for intracardiac lead impedance measurements using a painless waveform. It is a leakage detection system that includes a switch. He also holds another patent for an implantable defibrillator with sensing and pacing auto-capture capabilities. Amely Vélez has other patents pending. He is the coauthor of a patent, which is pending, for radio frequency antennas in implantable devices. The other two patents that are pending cover work related to magnetic and electric noise shielding in medical devices.
- José Leandro Montalvo Guenard (born 1885) – a native of Mayagüez. In 1939, Montalvo Guenard invented an instrument that allowed eye surgeons to securely hold and readily manipulate the eye lens in operations of cataracts. He was issued US Patent 2,224,575.

=== Musical instruments ===
The cuatro is the national instrument of Puerto Rico. It belongs to the lute family of string instruments. Very little is known about the exact origin of the Cuatro.

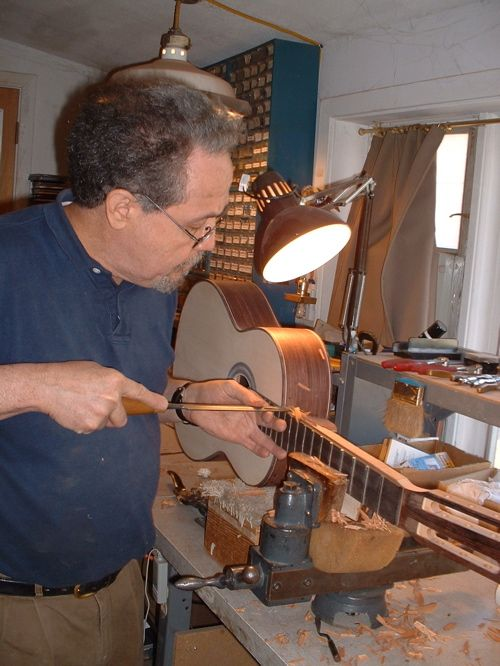
William R. Cumpiano

- William Richard Cumpiano is a works on the making of stringed musical instruments who also writes and teaches the art of luthiery. He has built numerous cuatros for musicians in the United States and also has crafted cuatro variants of his own design: he developed a "seis", or six-course (12-string) cuatro that can be tuned in the same string intervals as a guitar. He also developed the "thinline" cuatro with a body depth of only two inches instead of the traditional three.

=== Plastics ===
- Three Puerto Rican inventors, Guanglou Cheng and Carlos A. Ramirez, both of Mayagüez and Maria Aponte of Añasco, Puerto Rico, developed biodegradable polymers. A polymer is a large molecule (macromolecule) composed of repeating structural units connected by covalent chemical bonds. Well-known examples of polymers include plastics, DNA and proteins. According to the abstract released by the U.S. Patent & Trademark Office: "Degradable polymides are prepared in high yield by polymerizing a monomer containing at least two anhydride groups, and a monomer containing at least two primary amine groups and at least one acidic group, in bulk or in a solvent. The polymides are very strong in terms of their mechanical properties, yet degradable under standard physiological conditions." The inventors were issued U.S. Patent No. 7,427,654.

=== Public health ===
Ceramic Water Filter

- Ronald "Ron" Rivera (1948–2008) invented an inexpensive ceramic water filter used to treat gray water in impoverished communities. He established community-based factories to produce the filters around the world. The filter has been cited by the United Nations' Appropriate Technology Handbook, and tens of thousands of filters have been distributed worldwide by organizations such as International Federation of the Red Cross and Red Crescent, Doctors Without Borders, UNICEF, Plan International, Project Concern International, Oxfam and USAID.

Floating Strainer

- Angel Torres-Collazo of Guaynabo, Puerto Rico, developed a big water floating strainer that is constructed with a rectangular frame. According to the U.S. Patent & Trademark Office: "A cylindrical drum is attached to each corner of the rectangular frame. Below the rectangular frame, a box-strainer is fixed. The distance between the box-strainer and the rectangular frame is adjustable so that the level at which water is drawn can be raised or lowered."

=== Soft drinks ===
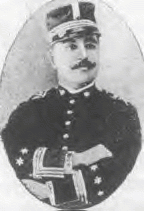
Angel Rivero

- Ángel Rivero Méndez (1856–1930) was a soldier, writer, journalist and a businessman who is credited with inventing the "Kola Champagne" a soft drink. After Rivero retired from the military, he founded the "Fabrica Polo Norte" (North Pole Factory) a soft drink company. Rivero is credited with the invention and elaboration of the "Kola Champagne" soda. Kola Champagne became, and still is, a very popular drink in Puerto Rico. It is also elaborated and sold in other countries, such as the United States, Colombia, Jamaica and Mexico.

== See also ==
- Timeline of United States inventions (before 1890)
- Timeline of United States inventions (1890–1945)
- Timeline of United States inventions (after 1991)
- School of Tropical Medicine
- History of United States patent law
- Lemelson Foundation
- Lemelson–MIT Prize
- List of African American inventors and scientists
- List of Puerto Ricans
- List of inventors killed by their own inventions
- List of prolific inventors
- List of Puerto Ricans in the United States Space Program
- NASA spinoff
- National Inventors Hall of Fame
- Native American contributions
- Science and technology in the United States
- Technological and industrial history of the United States
- Timeline of United States discoveries
- United States Patent and Trademark Office
- United States patent law
- Yankee ingenuity
- History of women in Puerto Rico
- Puerto Rican citizenship
- Outline of Puerto Rico
- Cultural diversity in Puerto Rico
  - Corsican immigration to Puerto Rico
  - French immigration to Puerto Rico
  - Crypto-Judaism
  - German immigration to Puerto Rico
  - Irish immigration to Puerto Rico
  - Royal Decree of Graces of 1815
- History of women in Puerto Rico
- Military history of Puerto Rico
- National Register of Historic Places listings in Puerto Rico
- 51-star flag
