= Amri Hernández-Pellerano =

Puerto Rican scientist

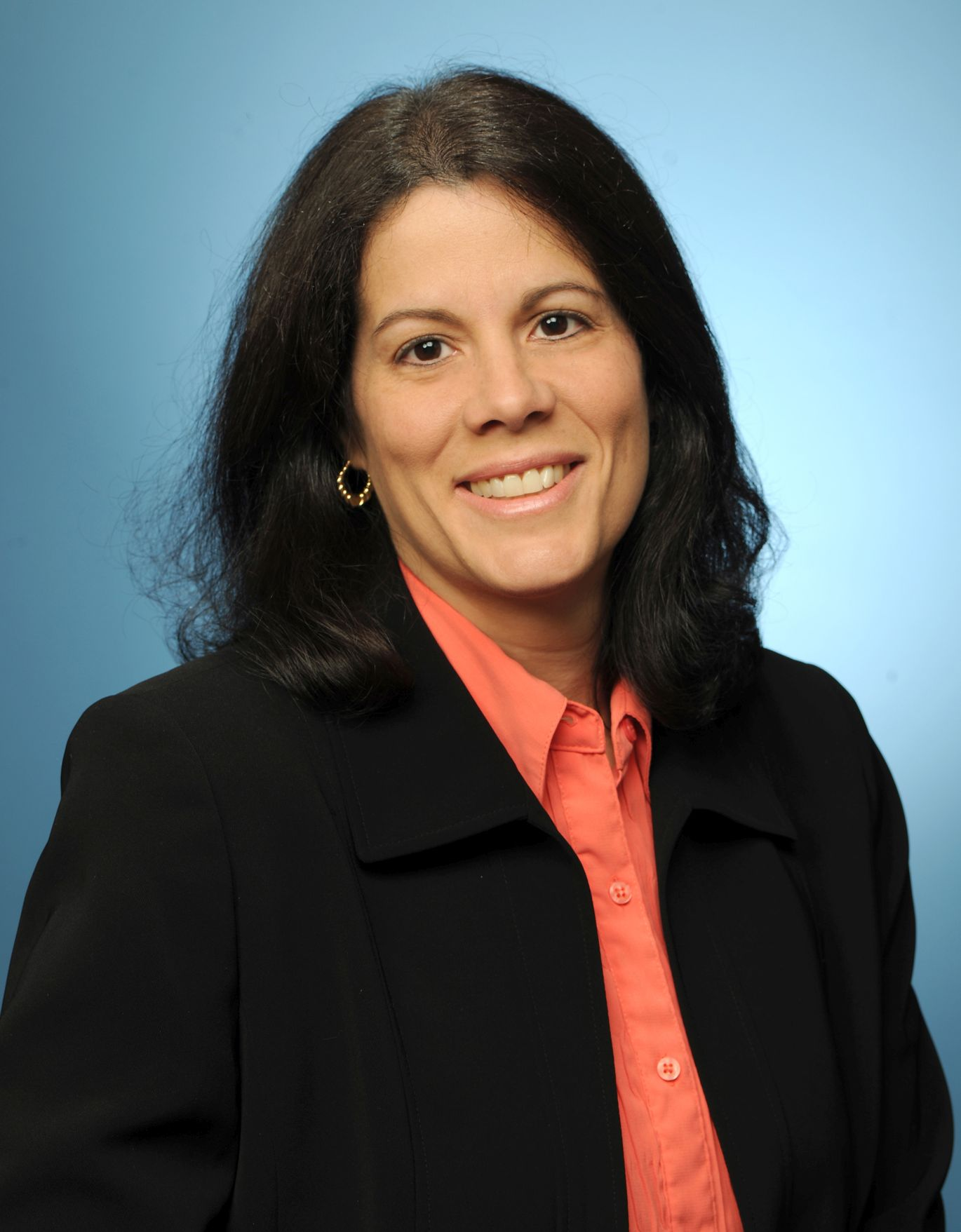
- Born: Caguas, Puerto Rico
- Education: University of Puerto Rico at Mayagüez (B.Sc.E.E.); Johns Hopkins University (MEng)
- Occupations: electronics engineer and scientist
- Spouse: Fernando A. Pellerano

Amri Hernández-Pellerano is a Puerto Rican electronics engineer and scientist who designs, builds and tests the electronics that will regulate the solar array power in order to charge the spacecraft battery and distribute power to the different loads or users inside various spacecraft at NASA's Goddard Space Flight Center. She designed the power systems electronics for the Wilkinson Microwave Anisotropy Probe (WMAP) mission. WMAP is a NASA Explorer mission spacecraft which measures the temperature of the cosmic background radiation over the full sky with unprecedented accuracy.

== Early years ==
Hernández-Pellerano was born and raised in Puerto Rico where she received her primary and secondary education. Her parents played an instrumental role in her life by encouraging her to pursue a college education. During her elementary school years, the subjects which she enjoyed most were math and science. After high school she entered the University of Puerto Rico at Mayaguez where she earned a Bachelor of Science degree in Electrical Engineering. While in college, she was accepted into the NASA Cooperative Education Program which allowed her to work with NASA scientists at the Goddard Space Flight Center in Greenbelt, Maryland and at the same time earn school credits. She started working at GSFC full-time after she earned her Electrical Engineering Bachelor (BSEE) degree at the UPR. While working full-time, GSFC provided her the opportunity to complete a master's degree in Electrical Engineering from The Johns Hopkins University.

== Career at NASA ==
In 1992, Hernández-Pellerano began working for the Power Systems Branch (PSB) at Goddard Space Flight Center (GSFC). As a Power System Electronics designer she has been involved in the design and implementation of power system electronics (PSE) for various scientific spacecraft. These include the Tropical Rainfall Measuring Mission (TRMM), the Wilkinson Microwave Anisotropy Probe (WMAP) and the Earth Observing-1 (EO-1) which are currently still in operation.

Her responsibilities include the designing, building and testing of the electronics that will regulate the solar array power in order to charge the spacecraft battery and distribute power to the different loads or users inside various spacecraft.

== WMAP mission ==
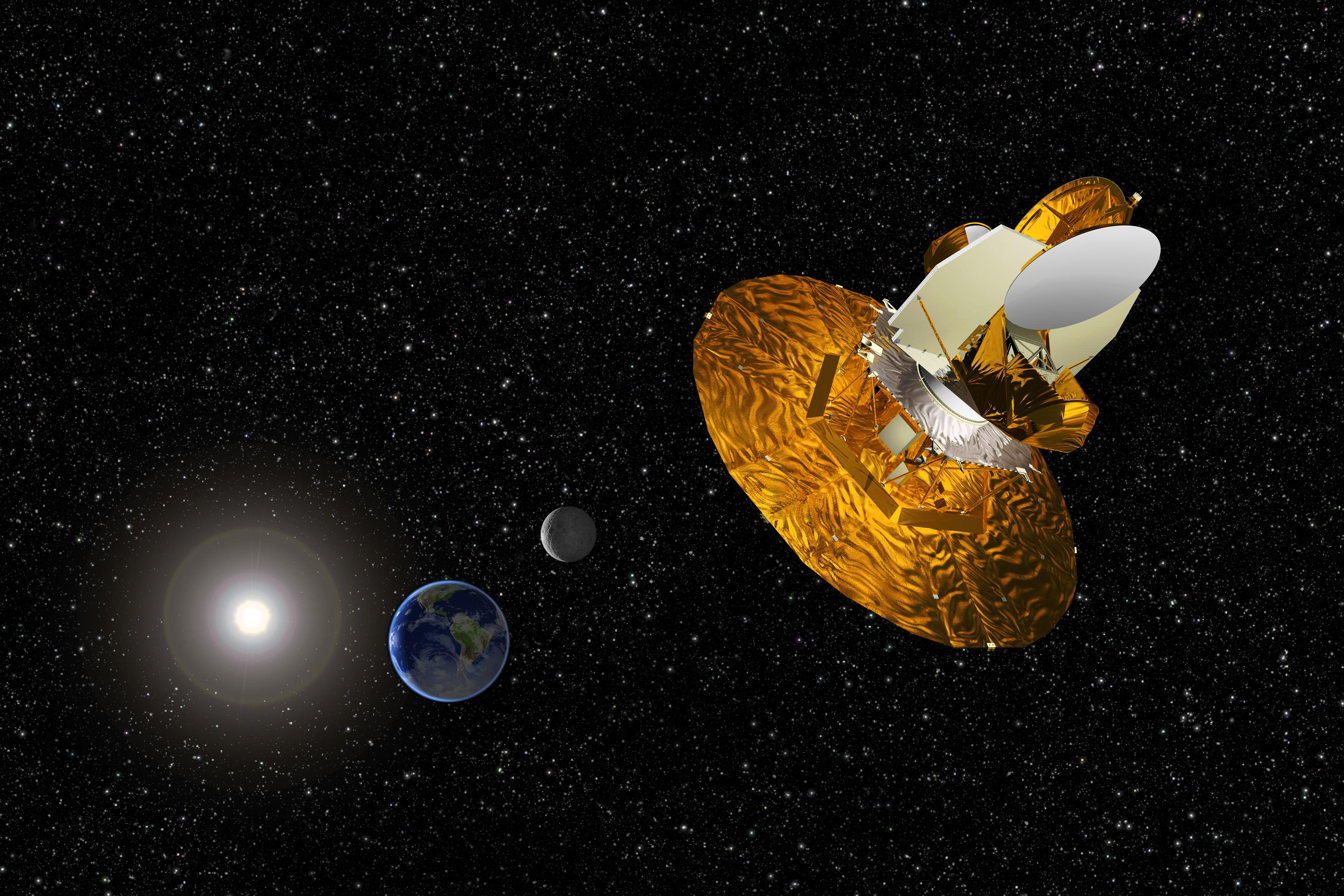
Artist depiction of the WMAP spacecraft

In 2003, she received the GSFC Engineering Achievement Award for her design of the Power Systems Electronics for the WMAP mission. WMAP is a NASA Explorer mission spacecraft which measures the temperature of the cosmic background radiation over the full sky with unprecedented accuracy. This map of the remnant heat from the Big Bang provides answers to fundamental questions about the origin and fate of our universe. In 2006, she was awarded the NASA Exceptional Service Medal.

== Currently ==
She is currently working on the Space Technology-5 (ST5), the Solar Dynamics Observatory (SDO), the Lunar Reconnaissance Observer (LRO) and the Aquarius/SAC-D (Satelite de Applicaciones Cientificas D) missions. Hernández-Pellerano is also the chair for the Hispanic Advisory Committee for Employees (HACE) at GSFC. This committee works with the Equal Opportunity Office and among other responsibilities, serves as a focal point for the concerns of Hispanic employees on matters affecting their employment at GSFC.

Hernández-Pellerano is married to fellow Puerto Rican Fernando Pellerano, a NASA scientist, whose job requires the planification, design and implementation of microwave instruments used in the scientific observations of the Earth and Space.

== Written works ==
Among the written works which Hernández-Pellerano has authored and/or co-authored are the following:

- The Space Technology 5 Avionics System (2004), Document ID: 20050156657; Report Number: IEEEAC Paper 1514
- Closed Loop Software Control of the MIDEX Power System (1998), Document ID: 19990007766
- An Adaptable Power System with Software Control Algorithm (1998), Document ID: 19990026561

== See also ==
- List of Puerto Ricans
- Puerto Rican scientists and inventors
- List of Puerto Ricans in the United States Space Program
- University of Puerto Rico at Mayaguez people
