= Ángel M. Marchand =

Puerto Rican allergy researcher

Dr. Ángel M. Marchand
- Born: June 1, 1912; Barceloneta, Puerto Rico
- Died: February 19, 2005 (aged 92); San Juan, Puerto Rico
- Education: Miami University (BA); Case Western Reserve University School of Medicine (M.D.)
- Occupation: immunologists

Angel M. Marchand (1 June 1912 in Barceloneta, Puerto Rico – 19 February 2005 in San Juan, Puerto Rico) was a Puerto Rican allergy researcher and clinician.

Educated at Case Western Reserve University School of Medicine, where he obtained his M.D. in 1935, after obtaining his B.A. in 1931 at Miami University in Hamilton, Ohio, he was one of Puerto Rico's first board-certified allergists and immunologists. Active in the American College of Chest Physicians, Marchand served as a Regent of the organization in 1951–52.

His constant research and extensive practice in allergy and immunology in Santurce, Puerto Rico allowed him to develop multiple vaccines to cure or prevent many allergies prevalent in tropical climates. This dedication resulted in an International Distinguished Fellowship Award from The American College of Allergy, Asthma & Immunology.

A prominent member of the Popular Democratic Party of Puerto Rico, his list of patients included Governor Luis Muñoz Marín, First Lady Inés Mendoza and future Senate President and Secretary of State Kenneth McClintock.

Marchand participated regularly in regional, hemispheric and international shooting competitions, including the 1968 Summer Olympics, where he was Puerto Rico's second oldest athlete, at the age of 56. He finished in 53rd place in the trap event.

== See also ==
- List of Puerto Ricans
- Puerto Rican scientists and inventors
