= Ingrid del Carmen Montes González =

American chemistry professor

- Born: November 19, 1958 (age 67); Puerto Rico
- Education: University of Puerto Rico, Río Piedras (BS, Ph.D.)
- Scientific career
- Thesis: (1985)
- Doctoral advisor: Gerald Larson
- Website: http://www.ingridmontes.org/

Ingrid del Carmen Montes González (born 1958), is a Puerto Rican chemist who is a professor in at the University of Puerto Rico, Río Piedras Campus. Her research focus is on chemical education and organometallic chemistry. Montes has been Director-at-large at the American Chemical Society (ACS) since 2013. Montes founded the "Festival de Química" (Chemistry Festival) in 2005, this program was then adopted by the ACS in 2010.

== Education ==
Montes attended the University of Puerto Rico, Río Piedras Campus (UPR-RP). She earned a B.S. in chemistry in 1980 and went on to complete a Ph.D. in organic chemistry in 1985 under the supervision of Gerald Larson. Her doctoral research focused on organometallic chemistry, particularly the synthesis of functionalized organosilanes and their applications in organic synthesis.

Montes began became a teaching assistant at UPR-RP in 1980. From 1981 to 1984, she worked as a research assistant while pursuing her doctoral studies, contributing to laboratory research in organometallic chemistry. In 1984, Montes also served as a part-time instructor at Interamerican University of Puerto Rico, teaching general and organic chemistry.

== Career ==
Montes was a lecturer at the College of Pharmacy at University of Puerto Rico, Medical Sciences Campus from 1985 to 1986 and as a curriculum specialist at Puerto Rico Junior College from 1986 to 1988. In 1987, she joined the faculty at UPR-RP as an assistant professor in the department of chemistry, where she taught courses in general chemistry, organic chemistry, organic synthesis, and hazardous waste disposal. Her research at the time focused on the synthesis of ferrocene derivatives, exploring their potential applications in catalysis, sensors, and materials science. She developed a strong interest in chemical education, emphasizing the use of inquiry-based and active learning approaches in teaching organic chemistry.

Montes was promoted to associate professor in 1992 and became a full professor in 1998. During this period, her research interests expanded to include the synthesis and characterization of ferrocenyl chalcones and their potential applications in biological systems, polymers, and sensors. Her work contributed to understanding the redox properties of ferrocene derivatives and their use in electrochemical sensors. She also played a role in chemical education, integrating active learning strategies and developing laboratory manuals for organic chemistry courses. Her work on chemical education included studies on different learning styles and their impact on student achievement in organic chemistry. Montes co-authored several laboratory manuals used in chemistry education at UPR. Montes served as coordinator of the Pre-MARC Program (a training program for minority students in biomedical research) from 1995 and assistant to the chairman in academic affairs from 1996 to 1998. In 2015, she was appointed assistant dean of graduate studies and research at UPR-RP.

Montes founded the “Festival de Química” in 2005, a community outreach event designed to demonstrate the importance of chemistry in everyday life. The initiative, initially implemented in Puerto Rico, expanded internationally through the American Chemical Society (ACS). Her involvement with ACS extended beyond outreach; she held leadership positions, including chair of the committee on community activities. She also served as president of the Puerto Rico section of ACS, contributing to the development of educational resources and mentoring programs for chemistry students. Montes is a fellow of ACS. In 2012, she was awarded the ACS volunteer service award.

In 2017, she received the Distinguished Women in Chemistry or Chemical Engineering Award from the International Union of Pure and Applied Chemistry. The following year, she was recognized as with the Mujer Puertorriqueña Distinguida en STEM, G Works, Inc.

In 2020, Montes was awarded the Dr. Osvaldo Ramírez Torres Award, the highest honor of the Chemists Association of Puerto Rico.

== See also ==
- History of women in Puerto Rico
- List of Puerto Rican scientists and inventors
