= Mayda Velasco =

Puerto Rican physicist

Mayda Marie Velasco
- Born: 1966 (age 59–60); Hato Rey, Puerto Rico
- Citizenship: American
- Education: University of Puerto Rico (BS), 1988); Northwestern University (Ph.D), 1995)
- Awards: Alfred P. Sloan Fellow CERN Achievement Award Woodrow Wilson Fellowship
- Scientific career
- Fields: Particle physics
- Workplaces: Northwestern University
- Thesis: A Study of the G(2) Spin Structure Function and the A(2) Nucleon-Virtual Photon Asymmetry Through the Polarized Deep Inelastic Muon-Proton Scattering (1995)
- Doctoral advisor: Donald Miller and Ralph Segel
- Website: Northwestern University

Notes
- Director of COFI

Mayda Velasco is a physicist and professor in the Department of Physics and Astronomy at Northwestern University. She works in experimental particle physics and is a leading member of the CMS Collaboration at the CERN LHC. She founded COFI and is its first director. She is a pioneer in the physics potential of photon colliders.

== Early life and education ==
Velasco went to high school at Academia Maria Reina in San Juan, Puerto Rico. She obtained her undergraduate degree from the University of Puerto Rico (Rio Piedras). She attended graduate school in physics at Northwestern University where she obtained her PhD in 1995 with Donald Miller and Ralph Segel as advisors.

== Research activities ==
Velasco's research career spans a wide range within experimental particle physics. She obtained her Ph.D. by making the first measurement of the spin structure function g2(x) using data collected by the Spin Muon Collaboration. She became a CERN Post-Doctoral Fellow in 1996 with Heinrich Wahl as her advisor. At CERN, she joined the NA48 experiment Collaboration. This experiment made precision measurements of neutral kaons, especially as regards CP violation. It also investigated rare kaon decays. Velasco formed her own collaboration to perform the NA59 experiment at CERN. This experiment demonstrated the channeling of high-energy particles in bent crystals and studied the production of circularly polarized high-energy photons. This topic connected well with her pioneering work in the physics potential of photon colliders, which she advocated at the Snowmass Meeting in 2001. Following that meeting, she promoted the Compact Linear Collider (CLIC) accelerator at CERN.

Velasco joined the faculty in the Department of Physics and Astronomy at Northwestern University in 1999. At that time she joined the Main injector oscillation neutrino search (MINOS) Collaboration to study neutrino oscillations. She left MINOS to join the CMS Collaboration at CERN - one of the two general-purpose experiments at the CERN LHC—where she continues to play a leadership role. As a member of this experiment at the Large Hadron Collider, she leads the effort of searches for very rare decays of the heaviest quark and the newly discovered Higgs boson. Her work has an important impact on the current understanding of the Higgs boson: she spearheaded the rare Z+photon decay channel which, in principle, can distinguish the standard model Higgs boson from those beyond the standard model.

== Awards and distinctions ==
Velasco received a Fellowship from the Alfred P. Sloan Foundation in 2002, as well as a Woodrow Wilson Fellowship from the Mellon Foundation. She is also a recipient of the CERN Achievement Award. Since 2018, she holds the UNESCO Chair on Fundamental and Interdisciplinary Physics Professorship at Northwestern University, a role established in recognition of her contributions to physics and in support of COFI, the institution she founded in 2014.

Velasco serves as a member of the High Energy Physics Advisory Panel (HEPAP) that advises the United States Department of Energy.

Velasco was given the Northwestern University Dean's Award for Diversity in 2015.

Velasco was elected president of the UPR Governing Board on August 26, 2021 for the 2021-2022 school year. She pledged to strengthen academics, improve facilities, and advocate for reduced oversight from the Fiscal Oversight Board while ensuring the university's financial stability.

== Colegio de Física Fundamental e Interdiciplinaria de las Ámericas (COFI) ==
Velasco founded the Colegio de Física Fundamental e Interdiciplinaria de las Ámericas (COFI) in San Juan, Puerto Rico in 2014. COFI hosts full-time students and scientists from Puerto Rico, the continental United States, and abroad to collaborate on emerging fundamental science projects. The institute also provides advanced training programs and public lectures. She is its first General Director.

== See also ==
- History of women in Puerto Rico
- List of Puerto Ricans
- Puerto Rican scientists and inventors
