= Pablo Clemente-Colon =

Puerto Rican scientist

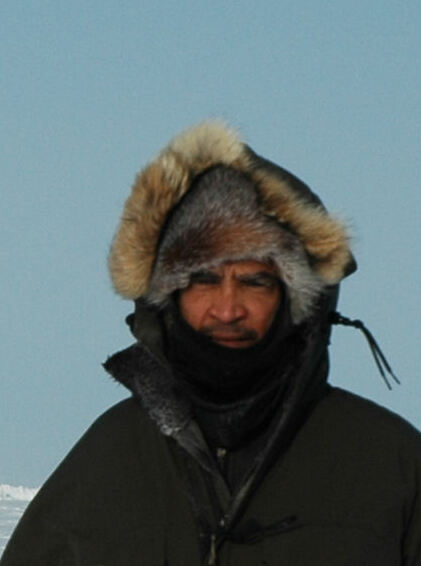
Pablo Clemente-Colón in 2007

Pablo Clemente-Colón born in Guaynabo, Puerto Rico is the first Puerto Rican to serve as Chief Scientist of the National Ice Center (NIC), headquartered in Alexandria, Virginia, a position he has held since 2005. As such, he serves the three entities that operate the NIC, the United States Navy, the National Oceanic and Atmospheric Administration (NOAA) and the United States Coast Guard.

== Education ==
He received the B.S. degree in physics from the University of Puerto Rico at Mayagüez, in 1977, the M.S. degree in oceanography from Texas A&M University, College Station, TX, in 1980, and the Ph.D. degree in marine studies from the University of Delaware, Newark, DE, in 2002.

== Career ==
From 1979 to 2005 he served as an Oceanographer at the NOAA's NESDIS Center for Satellite Applications and Research (STAR). Since 2008, he also serves as an Adjunct Assistant Professor at the United States Naval Academy in Annapolis.

Clemente-Colón traveled to the North Pole from 2007-2012 on the USCGC Healy (WAGB-20) to do research on global warming.

== Recent publications ==
=== 2009 ===
1. Clemente-Colón, P., 2009, Teledetección del hielo polar y clima [Remote Sensing of Polar ice and climate], book chapter in Oceanografía por Satélite: Fundamentos y Aplicaciones [Satellite Oceanography: Foundations and Applications]. Instituto Español de Oceanografía, Editorial Tébar, S.L., Madrid, in press.
2. Li, X., W. Zheng, W. G. Pichel, C.-Z. Zou, Clemente-Colón, P., and E. Maturi, 2009: Multisatellite observations and numerical simulation of an along-coast cumulus cloud line induced by sea breeze circulation, International Journal of Remote Sensing, Vol. 30, No. 14, 20 July 2009, 3573–3584.
3. Nghiem, S.V.. I. G. Rigor, Clemente-Colón, P., D.K. Perovich, and G. Neumann, 2009, Observations of the Decline of Arctic Sea Ice, JPL abstract release and poster at 3rd Symposium on the Impacts of and Ice- Diminishing Arctic on Naval and Maritime Operations, 9–11 June, Annapolis, MD.
4. Nghiem, S.V.. I. G. Rigor, A. Richter, J.P. Burrows, P. B. Shepson, J. Bottenheim, D.G. Barber, A. Steffen, J. Latonas, F. Wang, G. Stern, P. Clemente-Colón, S. Martin, D.K. Hall, P. Tackett, G. Neumann, and M.G. Asplin, 2009, Chemical Anomalies in the Arctic Troposphere from Sea Ice to Mountainsides, under review by Nature Geoscience.

=== 2008 ===
1. Clemente-Colón, P. (2007), The Poles, (lead author), book chapter in Hidden Depths: Atlas of the Oceans, HarperCollins, NOAA, Smithsonian National Museum of Natural History, UK's National Oceanography Centre (NOC), ISBN 978-0-06-134514-2.
2. Nghiem, S.V., I. G. Rigor, P. Clemente-Colón, D.K. Perovich, and G. Neumann; New record reduction of Arctic perennial sea ice in winter 2008, JPL Science Research Article, JPL D-44233, 13 March 2008.
3. Shin, D.-B., L. S. Chiu, and P. Clemente-Colón, Effects of atmospheric water and surface wind on passive microwave retrievals of sea ice concentration: a simulation study, Intl. J. Rem. Sens., DOI: 0.1080/01431160801978999, 14 July 2008.

=== 2007 ===
1. Li, X., W. Zheng, W. G. Pichel, C. Zou, and P. Clemente-Colón (2007), Coastal katabatic winds imaged by SAR, Geophys. Res. Lett., 34, L03804, doi:10.1029/2006GL028055.
2. Nghiem, S.V.. I.G. Rigor, D.K. Perovich, P. Clemente-Colón, J.W. Weatherly, and G. Neumann (2007), Rapid reduction of Arctic perennial sea ice, Geophys. Res. Lett., Vol. 34, L19504, doi:10.1029/2007GL031138, 200.
3. Pichel, W. and P. Clemente-Colón, Active microwave remote sensing for marine applications – current status and future plans, North Pacific Environmental Satellite Workshop for Coastal and Marine Applications, May 29–30, 2007, Juneau, Alaska, Abstract, Published on CD November 2007.
4. Pichel, W., T. Veenstra, J. Churnside, D. Foley, K. Friedman, R. Brainard, J. Nicoll, and P. Clemente-Colón, GhostNet – Marine debris detection in the North Pacific and Gulf of Alaska, North Pacific Environmental Satellite Workshop for Coastal and Marine Applications, May 29–30, 2007, Juneau, Alaska, Abstract. Published on CD November 2007.
5. Pichel, W.G., J.H. Churnside, T.S. Veenstra, D.G. Foley, K.S. Friedman, R.E. Brainard, J.B. Nicoll, Q. Zheng, P. Clemente-Colón (2007), Marine debris collects within the North Pacific Subtropical Convergence Zone, Marine Pollution Bulletin, 54, pp. 1207–1211.

=== 2006 ===
1. Clemente-Colón, P. and W.G. Pichel, 2006: Remote Sensing of Marine Pollution, Remote Sensing of the Marine Environment, J. Gower (Editor), Manual of Remote Sensing, Third Edition, Volume 6, A. N. Rencz, Editor- in-Chief, ASPRS, ISBN 1-57083-080-0.
2. Nalli, N.R., P. Clemente-Colón, P.J. Minnett, M. Szczodrak, V. Morris, E. Joseph, M.D. Goldberg, C.D. Barnet, W.W. Wolf, A. Jessup, R. Branch, R.O. Knuteson, and W.F.Feltz, Ship-based measurements for infrared sensor validation during Aerosol and Ocean Science Expedition 2004. Journal of Geophysical Research, Volume 111, 2006, pp.doi:10.1029/2005JD006385, 2006.
3. Nghiem, S.V., Y. Chao, G. Newumann, P. Lii, D.K. Perovich, T. Street, and P. Clemente-Colón, 2006: Depletion of perennial sea ice in the East Arctic Ocean, Geophysical Research Letters, Vol. 33, L17501, doi:10.1029/2006GL027198.
4. Pichel, W., P. Clemente-Colón, T. Veenstra, J. Churnside, D. Foley, K. Friedman, R. Brainard, J. Nicoll, Q. Zheng, Multi-platform Satellite Observations of the North Pacific Subtropical Frontal Zone and their Utility to Marine Debris Detection, Proceedings of the International Geosciences and Remote Sensing Symposium (IGARSS) 2006, July 31 - August 4, 2006, Denver, CO.
5. Pichel, W., P. Clemente-Colón, T. Veenstra, J. Churnside, D. Foley, K. Friedman, R. Brainard, J. Nicoll, Q. Zheng, Multi-platform Satellite Observations of the North Pacific Subtropical Frontal Zone and their Utility to Marine Debris Detection, Proceedings of the International Geosciences and Remote Sensing Symposium (IGARSS) 2006, July 31 - August 4, 2006, Denver, CO. Abstract only - 1 page.
6. Pichel, W., P. Clemente-Colón, X. Li, K. Friedman, F. Monaldo, D. Thompson, C. Wackerman, C. Jackson, R. Beal, H. Graber, J. McGuire, J. Nicoll, E. Malaret, and R. Espiritu, Status of the Development and Implementation of a NOAA SAR Products System for Coastal and Marine Operational Applications, OceanSAR 2006, Institute of Ocean Technology, St. John's, NL, October 23 to 25, 2006.
7. Rigor, I.G., M. Hanna, P. Clemente-Colón, and T. Street, 2006, Forecasting the Condition of Sea Ice on Weekly to Seasonal Time Scales, poster presented at the NOAA Climate Observation Program 4th Annual System Review, Silver Spring, MD. 10–12 May 2006.
8. Walker, N.. K. Partington, D. Simonin, T. Street, P. Clemente-Colón, S. Helfrich, and T. Skagemo-Andreassen, 2006: The role of Near Real Time Envisat ASAR Global Monitoring Mode data in Arctic and Antarctic operational ice services, SeaSAR 2006, Frascati, Italy January 21–28, 2006. H. Lacoste and L. Ouwehand (eds.), ESA SP-613. European Space Agency. published on CD-ROM, p. 30.1.

== Recognitions ==
National Oceanic and Atmospheric Administration:

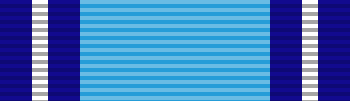
NOAA Administrator's Award (2009)

United States Department of Commerce:

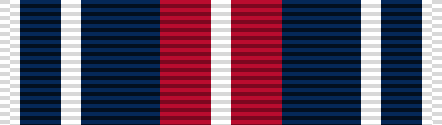
Department of Commerce Gold Medal (2014)

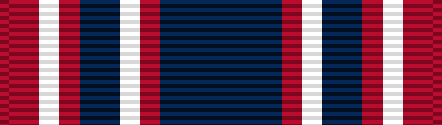
Department of Commerce Bronze Medal (1999)

United States Coast Guard:

Coast Guard Arctic Service Medal (2007) (2008)

United States Department of the Navy:

Navy Meritorious Civilian Service Award (2008)

== See also ==
- Global warming
- List of Puerto Ricans
- List of Puerto Rican scientists and inventors
