= Pedro Beauchamp =

Puerto Rican endocrinologist

Dr. Pedro J. Beauchamp
- Born: San Juan, Puerto Rico
- Occupation: Endocrinologist

Dr. Pedro J. Beauchamp is an endocrinologist who is the first Puerto Rican specialist certified by the American Reproductive Endocrinology and Infertility Board. In 1985, he performed the first in vitro fertilization (IVF) technique in Puerto Rico.

== In-vitro fertilization ==
Pedro J. Beauchamp was born in San Juan, Puerto Rico. In 1976, Dr. Beauchamp, completed his MD degree from the University of Puerto Rico School of Medicine. In 1982, Beauchamp was responsible and is credited with delivering the first triplets born by in-vitro fertilization in the United States and the first in-vitro baby born in Argentina. His work is known as GIFT (in vitro fertilization and embryo transfer) and TET (Tubal Embryo Transfer).

Dr. Beauchamp returned to Puerto Rico in 1985 and established his practice in reproductive endocrinology and infertility in the city of Bayamón. In 1986, he delivered the first child born from the in-vitro fertilization procedure in all of Puerto Rico at the Regional Hospital of Bayamón.

Dr. Beauchamp's In-Vitro Fertilization program was the first of 31 such programs established in the United States. Since its establishment in Puerto Rico thousands of families have been able to give birth to children. In the United States, he has the highest average for the planning and completion of successful in-vitro fertilization.

In his field, Dr. Beauchamp has published over 50 scientific works in myriad medical journals, and has been an invited speaker to numerous medical conferences.

== Honors and memberships ==
Dr. Beauchamp is a member of the American Society of Reproductive Medicine and a co-founder of "SART," the Society of Assisted Reproductive Techniques and Reproductive Endocrinology and In-fertilization Society.

In 1987, Dr. Beauchamp was awarded a "Guanín" award. He was also awarded the "DoctorˆÉ¬çs Choice Award" from the Buena Vista magazine.

== See also ==
- List of Puerto Ricans
- Puerto Rican scientists and inventors
