= Lissette Martinez =

Puerto Rican scientist

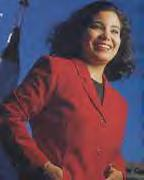
- Born: 1971 (age 54–55); Brooklyn, New York, United States
- Education: University of Puerto Rico at Mayagüez (BSE)
- Occupations: Electronics engineer and scientist

Notes
- Martinez was part of the team that launched a rocket from White Sands, New Mexico to gather information on the Comet Hale–Bopp in 1999.

Lissette Martinez (born 1971), is an electrical engineer and rocket scientist. She is the head of the Wallops Electrical Engineering Branch and the lead electrical engineer for the Space Experiment Module program at the Wallops Flight Facility (WFF) which is part of NASA's Goddard Space Flight Center (GSFC) where she is responsible for the testing of ground and flight hardware. She is a notable alumni at the University of Puerto Rico at Mayagüez.

== Early life ==
Martinez was born in Brooklyn, New York to Puerto Rican parents. She was raised in Yauco, Puerto Rico where her family moved to when she was a child. There, she received her primary and secondary education. When she reached 8th grade, she was given a class assignment to study the moon which required her to spend time on the roof of her house every night for a month. She wrote down and detailed every aspect of the way the moon looked. She remembers that as an instrumental factor which inspired her to pursue a career in Space Science.

== Education ==
After she graduated from high school, she applied and was accepted to the University of Puerto Rico at Mayagüez. During her third year as an electrical engineering student, she was accepted into the NASA Cooperative Education Program which allowed her to work with NASA scientist and at the same time earn school credits. In 1993, Martinez earned her Bachelor of Science in electrical engineering and was offered a job at NASA.

== Career in NASA ==
Martinez was part of the team that launched a rocket from White Sands, New Mexico to gather information on the Comet Hale–Bopp in 1999. She was featured in the November 2002 issue of Latina magazine.

She is responsible for providing electrical engineering support to Code 870 Space Experiment Module (SEM) program. She is also responsible for the testing of ground and flight hardware. Martinez works with students around the world, helping them with science experiments that will actually ride along on Space Shuttle missions and blast into space. Martinez continues to work at Wallops Flight Facility located in Virginia.

== Personal life ==
She lives with her husband and two sons in Salisbury, Maryland.

== See also ==
- History of women in Puerto Rico
- List of Puerto Ricans
- List of Puerto Rican scientists and inventors
- List of Puerto Ricans in the United States Space Program
- University of Puerto Rico at Mayagüez people
