= María Cordero Hardy =

Puerto Rican physiologist

- Born: June 12, 1932 (age 93); San Juan, Puerto Rico
- Other name: Mary Hardy
- Occupations: scientist, physiologist and educator
- Spouse: Anthony Hardy
- Children: Rick and Marisa Hardy

María Cordero Hardy (Note: This name uses Spanish marriage naming customs; the first is the maiden family name "Cordero" and the second or matrimonial family name is "Hardy".) (born June 12, 1932), also known as Mary Hardy, is a Puerto Rican physiologist, educator and scientist whose research on vitamin E helped other scientists understand how vitamins affect the human body.

== Early years ==
Cordero Hardy (birth name: María Cordero) was born and raised in San Juan, Puerto Rico. There she received her primary education at a boarding school. An only child, she was raised by her mother after her parents were divorced. In 1947, at the age of 15, she moved to Nebraska with her mother and her stepfather. There she learned to speak English. Upon her graduation from high school she was accepted and went to Fordham University.

== Vitamin "E" research ==
Cordero Hardy earned her doctorate degree in physiology. Her research into Vitamin E helped other scientists understand how vitamins affect the human body. According to Cordero Hardy's findings, Vitamin E is an antioxidant that has been effective in treating chronic hepatitis B, as stated in New Medicine: Complete Family Health Guide. Vitamin E has also exhibited the ability to protect the liver from damage that can occur in people with hepatitis C.

Cordero Hardy was the Project Director of the program which studied the effect of supplemental antioxidants Vitamin C, Vitamin E, and Coenzyme Q10 for the prevention and treatment of cardiovascular disease. The groups findings were published the titles: Evidence Reports/Technology Assessments, No. 83. She also reported a study that revealed that Vitex may affect levels of hormones that influence the menstrual cycle, reducing the symptoms of PMS. She was Associate Director, Botanical Research Center, Center for Human Nutrition, UCLA (2004)

Cordero Hardy was named medical director of the Cedars-Sinai Integrative Medicine Medical Group in Los Angeles. She was the Project Director of the program which studied the effect of supplemental antioxidants Vitamin C, Vitamin E, and Coenzyme Q10 for the prevention and treatment of cardiovascular disease. The groups findings were published the titles: Evidence Reports/Technology Assessments, No. 83. In 2004 she was also the Associate Director of the Botanical Research Center, Center for Human Nutrition in UCLA.

== Later years ==
Cordero Hardy met Anthony Hardy, whom she eventually married, during a vacation in England. She currently teaches medical technology at Louisiana State University. A medical technologist is a person who studies blood and other body fluids. In her book Scientist from Puerto Rico, Maria Cordero Hardy (American Women in Science Biography), author Mary Ellen Verheyden-Hilliard stated that Cordero Hardy had to learn a new language, and to overcome the low expectations, of those who believed that her gender and place of origin should limit her future.

== See also ==
- List of Puerto Ricans
- Puerto Rican scientists and inventors
- History of women in Puerto Rico
