= Fermín Tangüis =

Puerto Rican businessman (1851–1930)

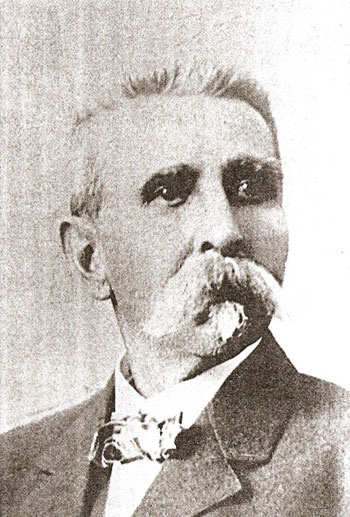
- developer of the Tanguis cotton seed which saved Peru's cotton industry.
- Born: March 29, 1851; San Juan, Puerto Rico
- Died: August 24, 1930 (aged 79); Lima, Peru

Fermín Tangüis (March 29, 1851 – August 24, 1930), was a Puerto Rican businessman, farmer, and scientist who developed the seed that would eventually produce the Tanguis cotton in Peru and save that nation's cotton industry.

== Early years ==
Tangüis' father, Henri Tangüis, emigrated from France to San Juan, Puerto Rico, where he met and married a young Spanish Puerto Rican girl by the name of Justa Uncal. Tangüis was born in San Juan, the capital of Puerto Rico, and there he received his primary and secondary education. Tangüis moved to Cuba to pursue a university degree; however when the Ten Years' War (1868–1878) broke out in that island, he decided that it would be best to move to South America.

He moved to Lima, Peru in 1873, when he was 22 years old and worked as a mercantile accountant. Tangüis went on to work in the mines of Castrovirreyna and later established his own businesses in Ayacucho and in Huancavelica. In July 1884, he married Isabel Novoa and in 1890, at the age of 39, he purchased land in Valle de Pisco and established a plantation dedicated to cultivation of cotton.

== Cotton and its significance in Peru's economy ==
Sugar and cotton were the two most important agricultural products of Peru in the 19th century. In 1901, Peru's cotton industry suffered because of a fungus plague caused by a plant disease known some places as "cotton wilt" and in others as "Fusarium wilt" (Fusarium vasinfectum). The plant disease, which spread throughout Peru, enters the plant by its roots and works its way up the stem until the plant is completely dried up. Many of the agriculturists who dedicated themselves to the cultivation of cotton were ruined and the cotton industry in general was in crisis.

== Tangüis cotton ==
Tangüis began to study some species of the plant that were affected by the disease to a lesser extent and experimented in germination with the seeds of various cotton plants. In 1911, after 10 years of experimenting and failures, Tangüis was able to develop a seed which produced a superior cotton plant resistant to the disease. The seeds produced a plant that had a 40% longer (between 29 mm and 33 mm) and thicker fiber that did not break easily and required little water. The cotton grown in Peru (Egyptian cotton) before the fungus plague grew only once a year; the Tangüis cotton grows six times a year. This type of fiber showed a better resistance and performance than other fibers.

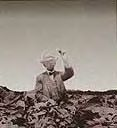
Fermin Tangüis in his plantation

Tangüis shared his new seeds with the other cotton growers, who named the plant which the seeds produced Tangüis Cotton. Tangüis cotton grows in Canete's valley (south of Lima) and in the Central Coast of Peru. The success of the Tangüis cotton, which is also known in Peru as "Oro Blanco" (White Gold), saved the cotton industry of that nation. In 1918, Peru began to export the Tangüis cotton variety, which together with the exportation of sugar, made it possible for the government of Peru to cover its national budget. It is highly regarded worldwide and is listed on the Cotton Exchange of Liverpool in the United Kingdom. In 1997, the Tanguis cotton, the variety which is preferred by the Peruvian national textile industry, constituted 75 percent of all the Peruvian cotton production, both for domestic use and apparel exports. The Tanguis cotton crop was estimated at 225,000 bales that year.

== Later years ==
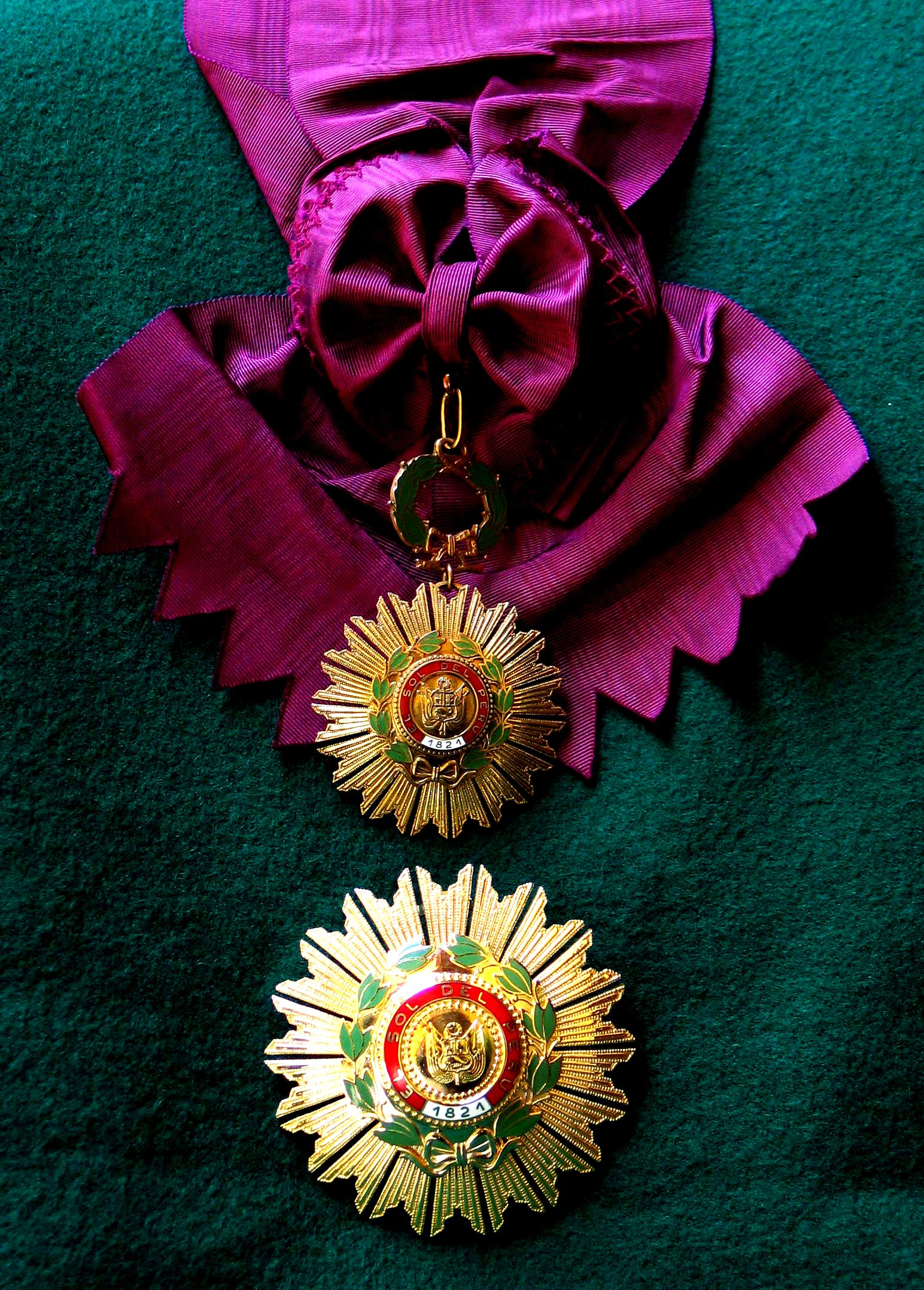
Orden del Sol

The President of Peru Augusto B. Leguia (1919 to 1930), honored Tangüis by presenting him with the "Orden del Sol" (Order of the Sun) medal. The Orden del Sol is a decoration which the Government of Peru presents to its citizens and foreigners for their extraordinary accomplishments in the fields of the arts, literature, culture and politics.

Tangüis became a wealthy man and continued to tend to his plantation the remainder of his life. Fermín Tangüis died on August 24, 1930, and is buried in the Presbitero Maestro Cemetery in Lima.

== Legacy ==
In Lima, there is a statue of Tangüis on a horse in Parque de la Reserva (Park of the Reserve). In 1985, Dr. Alberto Giesecke, committee member of the Cosapi National Prize, suggested that books be published about the lives and accomplishments of Peru's civilian heroes. The first book published was that of the life of Fermin Tangüis.

== See also ==
- List of Puerto Ricans
- French immigration to Puerto Rico
- Puerto Rican scientists and inventors
