= Orlando Figueroa =

Puerto Rican scientist

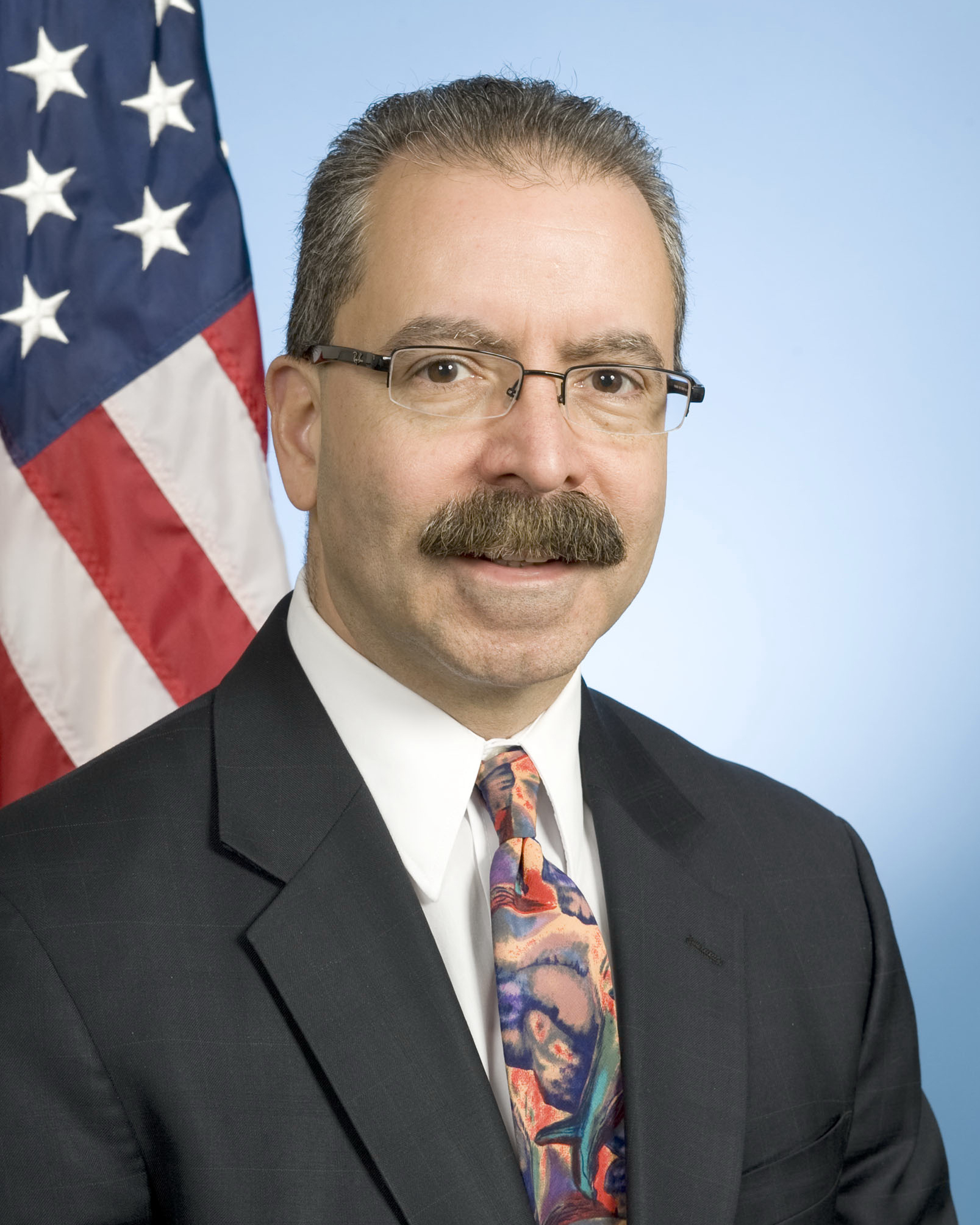
- Previously the NASA Mars Czar.
- Born: September 9, 1955 (age 70); San Juan, Puerto Rico
- Occupations: Mechanical Engineering, scientist

Orlando Figueroa (born September 9, 1955), previously the NASA Mars Czar Director for Mars Exploration and the Director for the Solar System Division in the Office of Space Science at NASA Headquarters and the Deputy Center Director for Science and Technology of the Goddard Space Flight Center. He has since retired in 2010 from NASA.

== Early career ==
Figueroa was born in San Juan, Puerto Rico. As a child he always had an interest in learning how mechanical toys functioned. During his elementary school years, he would occupy most of his time building things and looking for solutions to problems. After he finished his primary and secondary education, he went to high school, where he was an advanced mathematics student. The beginning of the space era, captured his attention during his childhood. He would gaze at the stars and moon and would try to imagine what it would be like to travel into space.

Figueroa enrolled in the University of Puerto Rico at Mayaguez and in 1978, he earned his bachelor's degree in mechanical engineering. Upon his graduation, he continued his studies and completed advanced courses in Mechanical Engineering at the University of Maryland, College Park.

== Career at NASA ==
External videos
- You may watch and listen to Orlando Figueroa recipient of the 2005 Service to America Medal here

In 1982, Figueroa was hired by NASA and was named Head of the Cryogenics Technology Section at the Goddard Space Flight Center located in Maryland. Among the other positions that Figueroa has held are, Lead Cryogenic Engineer for the Cryogenic Optical Assembly of the Cosmic Background Explorer, Manager for the Superfluid Helium On Orbit Transfer Shuttle Experiment, Manager for the Small Explorer Project, Manager for the Explorer Program and Director of the Systems, Technology and Advanced Concepts Directorate.

In 1997, Figueroa became a member of the Senior Executive Service of the U.S. Federal Government. In September 2003, he was appointed to the position of Director for the Solar Systems Division in the Space Science at NASA Headquarters and he also held the position of Director for Mars Exploration.

As Director of Mars Exploration, Figueroa led a team of hundreds of scientists, engineers and program specialists in one of the Agency's most ambitious projects to determine if life ever existed on Mars. The programs long range objective is to place humans into its present hostile environment. Under his directorship the Mars Explorer Rover mission launched Spirit and Opportunity in 2004. The launching of two rovers within days of each other had never been done before, and it was accomplished in three years, from conception to launch, in the wake of mission failures from Mars ’98.

In August 2005 Mr. Figueroa was appointed to the position of Director for System Safety and Mission Assurance at the Goddard Space Flight Center. In October 2005, Figueroa was named Director of Applied Engineering and Technology at Goddard, as such he is responsible for 1,300 employees and provides guidance on engineering and system technology. In January 2010, he accepted the position of Deputy Center Director for Science and Technology of Goddard Space Flight Center. Mr. Figueroa currently resides in Maryland with his family.

== Awards and recognitions ==
Figueroa received an Honorary Doctor's Degree. Among the many awards and recognitions which he has received are the following:

- The NASA Outstanding Leadership Medal (1993)
- The Community Stars Award from the Maryland Science Commission (1994)
- The President Rank Award for Outstanding Performance as Senior Executive (2001)
- The Pioneer Award (2002)
- Named "The Most Influential Hispanic in the Nation" by Hispanic Business magazine (2002).
- The National Space Society’s Space Pioneer Award for non-legislative government service (2016)

== See also ==
- Puerto Rican scientists and inventors
- List of Puerto Ricans
- List of Puerto Ricans in the United States Space Program
- University of Puerto Rico at Mayaguez people
