= Gualberto Ruaño =

Puerto Rican scientist

Gualberto Ruaño is a pioneer in the field of personalized medicine and the inventor of molecular diagnostic systems used worldwide for the management of viral diseases. Ruaño is President and Founder of Genomas, a genetics-related company and now the bio-tech anchor of Hartford Hospital’s Genetic Research Center; he also serves as Director of genetics research at the Center.

== Early years ==
Ruaño, who was born and raised in the city of Mayagüez, Puerto Rico, came to the United States to study medicine. He attended Johns Hopkins University where he obtained his baccalaureate degree, and was elected to Phi Beta Kappa. Ruaño also attended Yale University and his thesis was "A PCR-Based Paradigm for the Analysis of DNA Sequence Variation.

== Genomas, Inc. ==
Ruaño founded Genomas in 2003. Ruaño had previously founded Genaissance Pharmaceuticals, Inc. in 1997 as the pioneer company in pharmacogenomics. He served as Genaissance's CEO and Chief Scientific Officer. As CEO he led the IPO of the company in 2000 (NASDAQ: GNSC), which successfully raised $90 million, and to R&D partnerships with major pharmaceutical and biotechnology companies furthering the field with visibility. As CSO, he developed fundamental technology for genetic associations based on gene haplotypes. Prior to that, at Bios Laboratories since 1992, he invented the Coupled Amplification and Sequencing (CAS) System (U.S. patent 5,427,911) for the rapid determination of sequence variation and now used for infectious disease pharmacogenomics. Marketed worldwide by Bayer Diagnostics as Trugene, this technology was the first pharmacogenomic diagnostic system approved by the U.S. Food and Drug Administration (FDA) and is a leading example of personalized medicine in practice.

== Research ==
Ruaño's clinical research interests revolve around physiogenomics and nanotechnology. His public policy activities center on the implementation of genomics in personalized medicine from both regulatory and reimbursement perspectives. He was elected to the Connecticut Academy of Science and Engineering in April 2004, noted for his contributions to personalized medicine at the national level, and serves as the Chairman of the Academy's Health Care and Medical Technology Board. He is senior editor of the journal of Personalized Medicine. Ruaño serves on advisory committees of the American Association of Clinical Chemistry and of the National Academy of Clinical Biochemistry instituting guidelines for pharmacogenetic testing in the clinical laboratory. He was elected as a Fellow of the National Academy of Clinical Biochemistry and received the Beacon Alliance Medical Technology Award in 2005. He is also a founding Director of the Personalized Medicine Coalition in Washington, D.C. Over the last five years he has served in various steering committees working with the FDA on pharmacogenomic guidelines for drug development and is a member at the Manhattan Institute's 21st Century FDA Task Force. The Food & Drug Administration approached Genomas about doing the first pharmacogenomics conference on Hispanics in May 2010 in San Juan, Puerto Rico.

== Memberships ==
Ruaño is a trustee of the Wadsworth Atheneum Museum of Art and Bushnell Center for the Performing Arts in Hartford, Connecticut.

== See also ==
- List of Puerto Ricans
- Puerto Rican scientists and inventors
