= Eduardo Santiago Delpín =

Puerto Rican physician

Dr. Eduardo Santiago Delpín
- Born: Santurce, Puerto Rico
- Occupations: Physician, surgeon, author and educator

Dr. Eduardo Santiago Delpín is a physician, surgeon, educator and author who wrote the first book in Spanish about organ transplants. Dr. Santiago Delpín is the founder of the Latin American Transplant Register, The Pan-American Society of Dialysis and Transplants, plus the Latin American and Caribbean Society of Transplants.

== Early years ==
Santiago Delpín was born in Santurce, Puerto Rico. There he received his primary and secondary education. After his graduation from high school, he enrolled in the University of Puerto Rico where he first earned a bachelor's degree in science and followed by a medical degree from that institution's school of medicine. There he joined the Alpha chapter of Phi Sigma Alpha fraternity. After gaining experience as a surgeon in Puerto Rico's Hospital Universitario, he continued his medical education at the University of Minnesota Medical School. In said university he studied and gained experience in the fields of organ transplants and immunology and earned a master's degree in Science.

== Organ transplantation programs ==
Santiago Delpín returned to Puerto Rico and was named director of the Laboratory of Experimental Surgery. He was also named dean of the Association of Biomedical Sciences and Surgery Department of the University of Puerto Rico. He founded and directed various laboratories and organ transplantation programs, which included a laboratory of organ preservation and an experimental immunology laboratory.

In 1977, Santiago Delpín established his first organ transplantation program at the Veterans Administration Medical Center in San Juan, Puerto Rico. In 1984, he established the transplantation program at the Auxilio Mutuo Hospital. From that time until the year 2010, 1,589 patients have benefitted from these programs.

Santiago Delpín founded the Latin American Transplant Register, The Pan-American Society of Dialysis and Transplants, plus the Latin American and Caribbean Society of Transplants.

== "Organ transplantation" (the book) ==
Santiago Delpín is a professor of surgery at the University of Puerto Rico and program director of transplantation of organs of the "Hospital Auxilio Mutuo" (Mutual Aid Hospital).

He published 193 scientific articles and 146 abstracts on transplants, immunology and surgery. His book, Organ Transplantation, the first to be published in Spanish on the topic, won the Prize of Graphic Arts in Mexico. This book sold out in a year and a half, and is now in its second edition. The book covers the history of transplants in different countries and under different conditions. In addition to considering immunological and clinical procedures, the book also considers the effect of organ transplantation on religious beliefs, cultural consensus, personal ethics, and the human psyche.

== Written works ==
Among Santiago Delpín's written works are the following:

- "Exodo (Aqui y ahora)"; Publisher: La Editorial Universidad de Puerto Rico; ISBN 0-8477-0337-1;

ISBN 978-0-8477-0337-1.

- "Transplantes de Órganos"; by Eduardo A. Santiago-Delpín; Segunda Edición; Publisher: JGH Editores

== See also ==
- List of Puerto Ricans
- Puerto Rican scientists and inventors
