= Diego R. Solís =

Puerto Rican physician

Diego R. Solís is the founder and director of the "Centro de Cirugías de Hígado y Páncreas" (Liver and Pancreas Surgery Center). He made Puerto Rican medical history when he performed the first simultaneous pancreas and kidney transplant in Puerto Rico.

== Medical educational background ==
Solís earned his General Surgeon's degree from the University of Puerto Rico, Medical Sciences Campus. He continued his training in advanced surgery at the University of Florida in the Shands Hospital. There he became familiar and gained experience in hepatobiliary surgery. He also participated in the transplants of the liver, pancreas and kidneys, thus becoming ASTS certified.

== Transplant ==
On March 9, 2007, Dr. Solís performed the first simultaneous pancreas and kidney transplant in Puerto Rico, at the "Hospital Auxilio Mutuo" (Mutual Aid Hospital), a procedure which lasted 8 hours.

== Scientific investigations ==
Dr. Solís, who is also the director of the pancreas transplant program of said institution, has made numerous scientific investigations in the field of hepatobiliar surgery with a special interest in the causes and treatment of advanced tumors of the liver.

In 2007, Dr. Solís received a tribute from the Puerto Rico Chamber of Representatives in recognition of his accomplishment in performing the first simultaneous pancreas and kidney transplant in Puerto Rico. He was awarded the 2010 "Doctors Choice Award.

== See also ==
- List of Puerto Ricans
- Puerto Rican scientists and inventors
