= José Leandro Montalvo Guenard =

Puerto Rican historian

- Born: 1885; Mayaguez, Puerto Rico
- Died: 1950; Ponce, Puerto Rico
- Education: University of Maryland, Baltimore (MD)
- Occupations: Physician, Inventor, Anthropologist, Historian
- Spouse: Berta Krider de Montalvo

José Leandro Montalvo Guenard (1885–1950) was a Puerto Rican physician, inventor, anthropologist and historian. He is known for his "Rectificaciones Históricas: El Descubrimiento de Boriquén", published by Editorial del Llano, in Ponce, Puerto Rico, in 1933.

== Early years and schooling ==
Montalvo Guenard was born in Mayaguez, Puerto Rico. After graduating from high school, he attended the Deichmann Institute where he earned a Bachelor of Science in 1907, and then studied medicine at the University of Maryland, Baltimore graduating with a Medical Degree in 1911.

== Professional life and inventor ==
From 1911 to 1914, he was the Public Health officer for the municipality of Santa Isabel, Puerto Rico. From 1922 to 1933, he was Public Health Officer for the Municipality of Ponce. During 1934–35, he was a tisiologist at the now-defunct Ponce Hospital for Tuberculosis, and starting in 1935 he was Director of the Ponce Asylum for the Blind (Hospital de Ciegos). In 1939, Dr. Montalvo Guenard invented an instrument that allowed eye surgeons to securely hold and readily manipulate the eye lens in operations of cataracts. He was issued US Patent 2,224,575.

== Archeologist, memberships and interests ==
From 1925 to 1935, Montalvo Guenard also acted as the municipal archeologist for the city of Ponce. Due to the diversified nature of his interests, Montalvo held memberships in the Archaeological Institute of America, the Puerto Rican Academy of History, and the Puerto Rico Medical Association. Montalvo Guenard's interest laid in anthropology, especially archeology and ethnology, in Puerto Rican prehistory and protohistory and in internal medicine.

== Death and legacy ==
He is interred at Forest Lawn Memorial Park, Glendale, California, USA. He is recognized at Ponce's Park of Illustrious Ponce Citizens. si

== See also ==
- Ponce, Puerto Rico
- List of Puerto Ricans
- List of Puerto Rican scientists and inventors
