= Sixto González =

Astronomer; director of the Arecibo Observatory in Puerto Rico

Sixto A. González
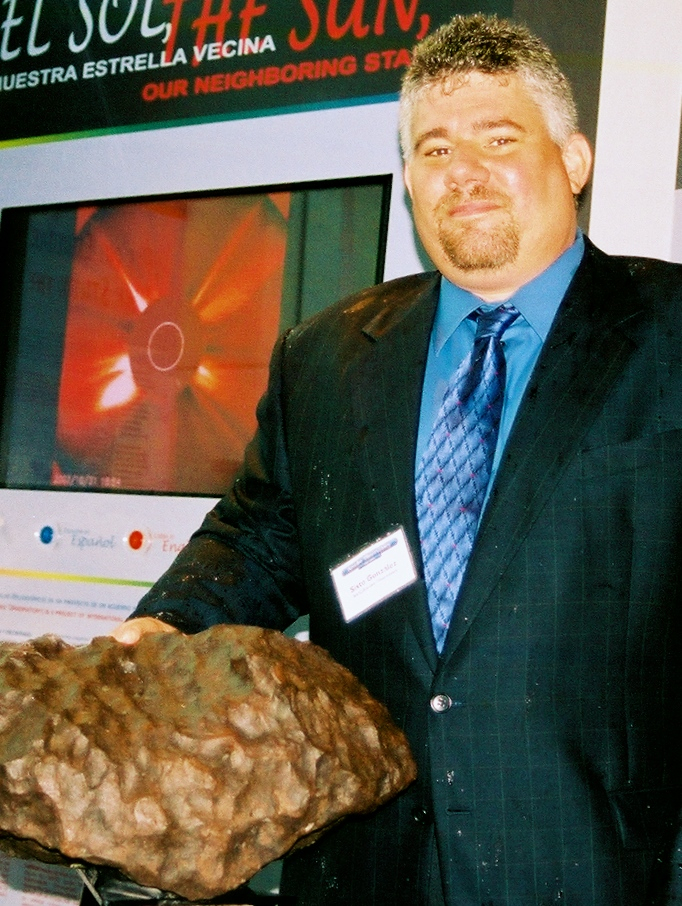
- Sixto A. González in 2003
- Born: 1965 (age 60–61); Bayamon, Puerto Rico
- Education: University of Puerto Rico at Humacao (BS); Utah State University (Ph.D.)
- Scientific career
- Fields: Scientist
- Workplaces: SRI International
- Doctoral advisor: Bela G Fejer

Notes
- González was honored by the United States House of Representatives.

Sixto A. González Edick (born 1965) was the Director of the Arecibo Observatory from September 29, 2003, to September 15, 2006. Arecibo Observatory was an astronomical observatory located in Puerto Rico. At the time of González's directorship Arecibo was the world's largest single dish radio telescope. González was the first Puerto Rican in the position of Director of the observatory.

== Early years ==
González was born in Bayamón, Puerto Rico. Lived his early years in Yabucoa, Puerto Rico. In 1983, he moved to Massachusetts. González returned to the island in 1985 and enrolled at the University of Puerto Rico at Humacao to study Applied Physics and Electronics, earning his Bachelor of Science degree in 1988. He was accepted at MIT. González completed his Ph.D. in 1994 at Utah State University.

== Director of the Arecibo Observatory ==
When González returned to the island, he became the first Puerto Rican member of the scientist staff of Arecibo Observatory and was named research associate at the observatory. He held this position until 1999 when he was named senior research associate. He and Jose Alonso, educational officer at the observatory, and Maiella Ramos (UPR) created a new program of firsthand research experience in geosciences for high school students and their teachers and for undergraduates in northwest Puerto Rico.

In 2001, González was named assistant director for space and atmospheric sciences at the radar facility. On September 29, 2003, González became the first Puerto Rican to be named Director of the observatory. This appointment was made by Robert Brown, director of the National Astronomy and Ionosphere Center (NAIC). González was responsible for the overall management of the facility, including the executions of basic policy that maintains the observatory at the front of research in astronomy, planetary studies and space and atmospheric science. The appointment to the position of site director was for a three-year term and it expired on September 15, 2006.

In early 2009, a "Dear Colleague" letter from Dana Lehr announced the following: "NSF will compete the next cooperative agreement for the management and operation of the National Astronomy and Ionosphere Center (NAIC) through an open, merit-based review process...."

In early June 2011 the National Science Foundation (NSF) announced that the cooperative agreement to manage, operate and maintain the Arecibo Observatory in Puerto Rico for the next five years (from 2011 to 2016) would be awarded to SRI International. Gonzalez retired as Director for Space and Atmospheric Sciences at the Arecibo Observatory that was part of SRI's Center for Geospace Studies.

== Honors ==
On October 30, 2003, González was honored by the United States House of Representatives when he was publicly congratulated.

== See also ==
- Puerto Rican scientists and inventors
- German immigration to Puerto Rico
