= Nova Southeastern University College of Engineering and Computing =

The College of Engineering and Computing, commonly known as CEC, formerly the Graduate School of Computer and Information Sciences, at Nova Southeastern University provides educational programs to prepare students for leadership roles in technology. The college is located on the main campus in Fort Lauderdale, Florida within the Carl DeSantis building. In addition to its regional accreditation by the Commission on Colleges of the Southern Association of Colleges and Schools, NSU has been designated a National Center of Academic Excellence in Information Assurance Education by the U.S. National Security Agency and the United States Department of Homeland Security.

== Degree programs ==
The college offers several bachelor's, master's, and doctoral programs.

- B.S. in computer science
- B.S. in information technology
- B.S. in engineering
- M.S. in computer science
- M.S. in cybersecurity management
- M.S. in information assurance & cybersecurity
- M.S. in information systems
- M.S. in information technology
- Ph.D. in computer science
- Ph.D. in information assurance
- Ph.D. in information systems

== National Center of Academic Excellence in Information Assurance Education ==
On April 17, 2008, NSU was re-designated a National Center of Academic Excellence in Information Assurance Education for the academic years 2008-2014 by the National Security Agency (NSA) and the Department of Homeland Security (DHS). NSU first received this designation in March 2005 covering the period through March 2008. CEC’s information security curriculum meets the NSA Committee on National Security Systems standards 4011, 4012, and 4013.
