= George Norton Wolcott =

American entomologist

George Norton Wolcott (12 July 1889 – 20 October 1965) was an American entomologist who was a specialist on the insects of the Caribbean region, particularly Puerto Rico, where he was involved in the study and control of insect pests in sugarcane cultivation. He pioneered the use of augmented releases of insect egg parasitoids in the genus Trichogramma to control lepidopteran pests in sugarcane.

Wolcott was born to David Clinton Wolcott and Marion Delia Benedict in Utica, New York. His father was a lawyer, and his mother was a talented watercolour artist. His brother and sister took to architecture, while he followed an early interest in insects. He studied at the Utica Free Academy and graduated from the New York State College of Agriculture around 1907–09, followed by an MS in agriculture in 1915. He received a Ph.D. from Cornell University in 1925. He worked in the Department of Agriculture in Texas before moving to Puerto Rico and working with the Sugar Producers Association for two years from 1910 and then at the experimental station at Rio Pedras from 1914. He moved around the Caribbean region, working in Peru, Haiti and the Dominican Republic over the next decade. He specialized in the pests of sugarcane and their management using parasitoids. He published a series on the insects of Puerto Rico and wrote on economic entomology in the West Indies.

Wolcott married Magdalen Ames in 1919, and they had three children, Ollie, David, and Ann
