= Sovereignty of Puerto Rico during the Cold War =

Puerto Rico in the Cold War

During the height of the Cold War, Latin America became a strategic pillar of the hemispheric defense doctrine, serving a key to the power struggle between East and West. Following the Cuban Revolution and the overthrow of the US-friendly government of Fulgencio Batista, the United States became concerned with the spread of the Soviet Union's influence in Latin America, becoming heavily invested in retaining as much influence as possible. With the nuclear arms race at its peak, a Soviet transfer of nuclear warheads to its Latin American ally in Cuba nearly concluded in the onset of World War III in October 1962. Afterward, the United States hardened its influence throughout Latin America, involving itself in what became known as the "Dirty War", a process that involved questionable actions including supporting or overthrowing governments depending on political leaning, supporting subversive groups such as the Contras with weaponry and funding, or participating in controversial operations such as Operation Charly and Operation Condor. The fallout from these actions affect Latin America–United States relations to this day.

Having been annexed from Spain in 1898, the unincorporated territory of Puerto Rico represented a paradox during the Cold War, politically belonging to the United States but culturally to Latin America. Its location in the Caribbean converted it in the American response to Cuba, directly affecting the development of its political status. Puerto Rico was allowed to enact a heavily revised local Constitution, but its attempts to employ its sovereignty and use it to remove the application of the Territorial Clause of the United States Constitution ended in failure. The United States military played a key role in perpetuating the status quo, not wanting to risk the possibility that a change in status could affect their presence in the Caribbean. A situation further complicated by the emergence of Marxist guerrillas, including the notorious Fuerzas Armadas de Liberación Nacional Puertorriqueña and Boricua Popular Army, within the pre-existing independence movement in Puerto Rico. Ultimately, the status issue stagnated throughout the remainder of the Cold War, but the pro-sovereignty efforts undertaken during this time frame eventually led to the current incarnation of the free association movement in Puerto Rico.

== Background ==
=== Marxist expansion in Latin America ===
Throughout much of Latin America, reactionary oligarchies ruled through their alliances with the military elite and United States. Although the nature of the U.S. role in the region was established many years before the Cold War, the Cold War gave U.S. interventionism a new ideological tinge. But by the mid-20th century, much of the region passed through a higher state of economic development, which bolstered the power and ranks of the lower classes. This left calls for social change and political inclusion more pronounced, thus posing a challenge to the strong U.S. influence over the region's economies.

In Cuba, the July 26 Movement seized power in January 1959, toppling President Fulgencio Batista, whose unpopular regime had been denied arms by the Eisenhower administration.

Diplomatic relations between Cuba and the United States continued for some time after Batista's fall, but President Eisenhower deliberately left the capital to avoid meeting Cuba's young revolutionary leader Fidel Castro during the latter's trip to Washington in April, leaving Vice President Richard Nixon to conduct the meeting in his place. Cuba began negotiating arms purchases from the Eastern Bloc in March 1960.

In January 1961, just prior to leaving office, Eisenhower formally severed relations with the Cuban government. In April 1961, the administration of newly elected American President John F. Kennedy mounted an unsuccessful CIA-organized ship-borne invasion of the island at Playa Girón and Playa Larga in Las Villas Province—a failure that publicly humiliated the United States. Castro responded by publicly embracing Marxism–Leninism, and the Soviet Union pledged to provide further support.

By the 1960s, Marxists gained increasing influence throughout the regions, prompting fears in the United States that Latin American instability posed a threat to U.S. national security. Latin American revolutionaries shifted to guerrilla tactics, heavily influenced by the Cuban Revolution. Arbenz fell when his military had deserted him. Since then, some future Latin American social revolutionaries and Marxists, most notably Fidel Castro and the Sandinistas in Nicaragua made the army and governments parts of a single unit and eventually set up single party states. Overthrowing such regimes would require a war, rather than a simple CIA operation, the landing of Marines, or a crude invasion scheme like the Bay of Pigs Invasion.

=== American involvement ===
Throughout the Cold War years, the U.S. acted as a barrier to socialist revolutions and targeted populist and nationalist governments that were aided by the communists. The CIA overthrew other governments suspected of turning pro-communist, such as Guatemala in 1954 under Jacobo Arbenz Guzman. The CIA Operation PBSuccess eventually led to the 1954 coup that removed Arbenz from power. The operation drew on an initial plan first considered in 1951 to oust Arbenz named Operation PBFortune. Arbenz, who was supported by some local communists, was ousted shortly after he had redistributed 178,000 acres (720 km^{2}) of United Fruit Company land in Guatemala. United Fruit had long monopolized the transportation and communications region there, along with the main export commodities, and played a major role in Guatemalan politics. Arbenz was out shortly afterwards, and Guatemala came under control of a repressive military regime.

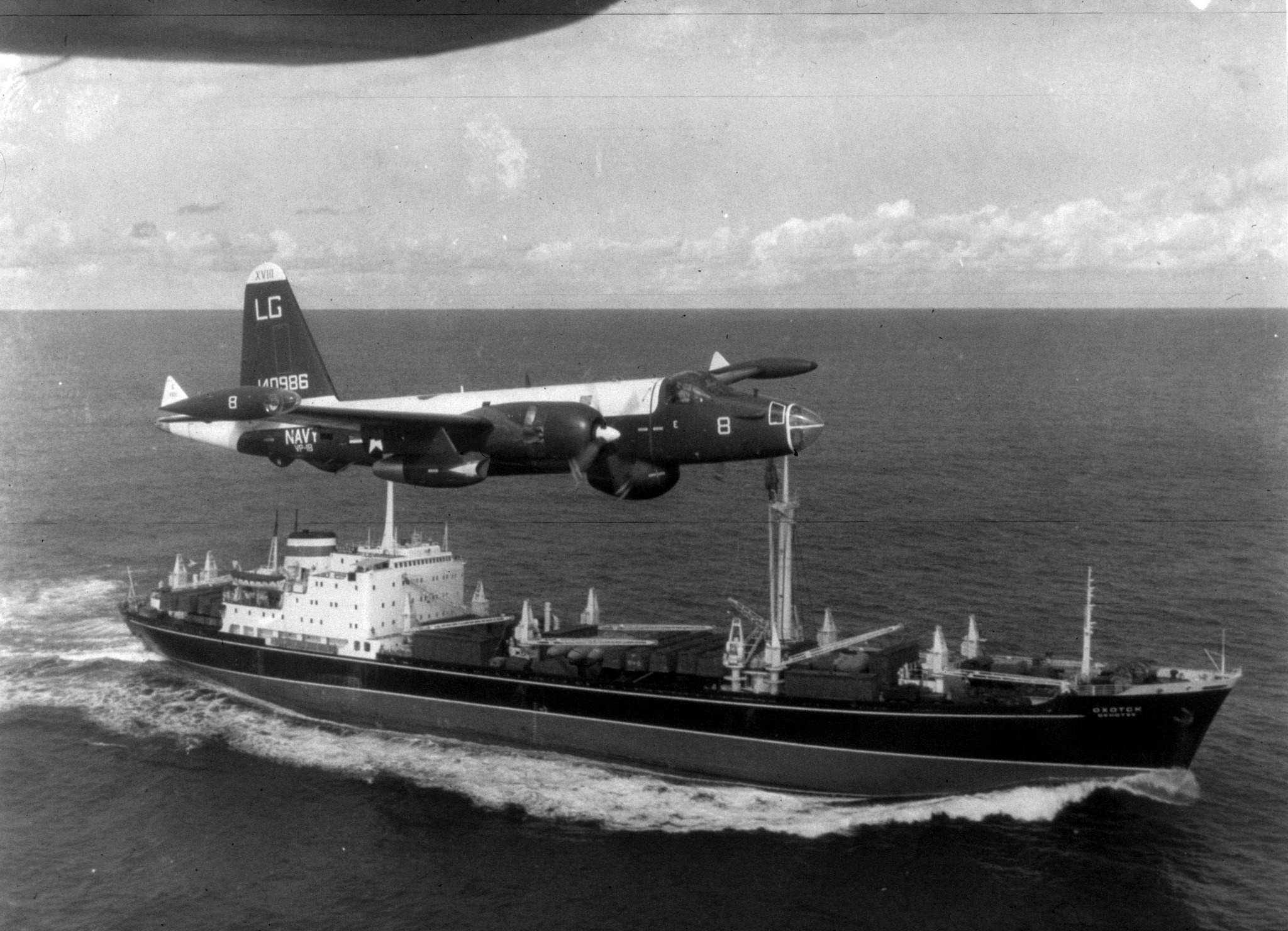
A U.S. Navy P-2 of VP-18 flying over a Soviet freighter during the Cuban Missile Crisis.

Continuing to seek ways to oust Castro following the Bay of Pigs Invasion, Kennedy and his administration experimented with various ways of covertly facilitating the overthrow of the Cuban government. Significant hopes were pinned on a covert program named the Cuban Project, devised under the Kennedy administration in 1961.

In February 1962, Khrushchev learned of the American plans regarding Cuba: a "Cuban project"—approved by the CIA and stipulating the overthrow of the Cuban government in October, possibly involving the American military—and yet one more Kennedy-ordered operation to assassinate Castro. Preparations to install Soviet nuclear missiles in Cuba were undertaken in response.

Alarmed, Kennedy considered various reactions, and ultimately responded to the installation of nuclear missiles in Cuba with a naval blockade and presented an ultimatum to the Soviets. Khrushchev backed down from a confrontation, and the Soviet Union removed the missiles in return for an American pledge not to invade Cuba again. Castro later admitted that "I would have agreed to the use of nuclear weapons....we took it for granted that it would become a nuclear war anyway, and that we were going to disappear."

The Cuban Missile Crisis (October–November 1962) brought the world closer to nuclear war than ever before. It further demonstrated the concept of mutually assured destruction, that neither superpower was prepared to use their nuclear weapons, fearing total global destruction via mutual retaliation. The aftermath of the crisis led to the first efforts in the nuclear arms race at nuclear disarmament and improving relations, although the Cold War's first arms control agreement, the Antarctic Treaty, had come into force in 1961.

In 1964, Khrushchev's Kremlin colleagues managed to oust him, but allowed him a peaceful retirement. Accused of rudeness and incompetence, he was also credited with ruining Soviet agriculture and bringing the world to the brink of nuclear war. Khrushchev had become an international embarrassment when he authorized construction of the Berlin Wall, a public humiliation for Marxism–Leninism.

== History ==
=== The PPD and the pursuit of sovereign association ===
The pursuit of sovereignty within the Popular Democratic Party (PPD) can be traced to the moment of its foundation. The organization was originally created to support the independence of Puerto Rico, following the division of the Liberal Party. Among the party's early leaders were Muñoz and Antonio Fernós-Isern, both supporters of Puerto Rican independence. Within the PPD, the concept of an Estado Libre Asociado (lit. "Associated Free State") was conceived by Fernós as a sovereign body associated to the United States by mutual consent. He first presented his idea of a sovereign association that preserved a common coin, citizenship and market access in a press article published in 1939. Fernós declared that Puerto Rico had a right to acquire its sovereignty and as such, could also delegate part of it as long as it was on equal juridical and moral terms. He proposed a model which allowed a proper nationality that was associated, but not subordinated to the other. The proposal intended to negotiate which rights and responsibilities each side would retain through a "bilateral organic pact". The idea took some inspiration from Ancient Greece, where deferent states would enter into confederations in order to cooperate in common interests. Like its Liberal Party predecessor, this proposal was also influenced by the British model.

Fernós argued that the Commonwealth realm relationship between Canada and the United Kingdom surpassed a simple form of autonomy, instead being a kind of association superior to any status that would keep the sovereignty of Puerto Rico in the hands of Congress. He considered his proposal a "free federated commonwealth" and a "republic lacking international relations", which would be freely delegated to the Federal Government of the United States. Among other observations, Fernós also noted how ridiculous it was to see the United States Congress hold the sovereignty of Puerto Rico when it wasn't the sovereign of the United States or its people and only served as a representative of the popular vote. He ultimately condemned the idea of a status where sovereignty was forfeit in favor of autonomy, comparing such an arrangement to a monarchy. The following year, Fernós analyzed the complications of directly transitioning from the colonial economic model established by the United States and listed what he considered could be possible steps for a prosperous sovereignty. On July 21, 1940, the founding assembly for the new party was held with the collaboration of 2,000 delegates. Fernós, who thought that the socio-economic issues should be attended first, was largely responsible for drafting the respective part of the party's program, being joined by Vicente Géigel Polanco and Rafael Arjona Siaca.

Inspired by a painting by Ramón Frade named "El Pan Nuestro", he proposed the jíbaro as the party's mascot and also coined the "Partido Popular" part of the name, which was completed in a reunion to earn its current name, Popular Democratic Party. For the following years, Fernós played a key role within the PPD, most notably in its legislation and finances. He reluctantly ran for the position of Resident Commissioner at the 1940 general elections. In 1945, Muñoz led a local Commission that later became involved in the process to create a third option that fell between independence and statehood, the similarly defined "Dominion" status authored by Vicente Géigel Polanco. Despite these advances, Fernós continued elaborating his ever-evolving model for a "third option". In 1946, Fernós noted that as part of the ongoing process, Congress had to openly express its willingness to renounce the sovereignty of Puerto Rico that it had acquired through the Treaty of Paris, thus allowing the archipelago to create a proper self-government. Furthermore, he argued that the transfer of sovereignty that took place in 1898 should be invalidated. Despite the veto of appointed American governor Rexford Tugwell, the PPD's legislature approved a two projects towards this goal, one supporting a status referendum and the other supporting the nomination of a Puerto Rican to the office of governor, only to receive the veto of president Harry S. Truman. In July 1946, Tugwell abandoned the office of governor. Piñero was then appointed as the new governor, the first Puerto Rican to do so under American colonial rule.

The Estado Libre Asociado as conceived by Fernós was focused on the internationalization of Puerto Rico rather that its growth within the limitations imposed by the Constitution of the United States, as exposed in an article published by him on July 2, 1946, where he discussed the type of relation that should be established with the rest of the world. The most notable example is his argument that the economy needed to evolve from the bilateral terms of the territorial clause to a multilateral model that allowed for better trade options. Fernós also supported the conservation of the economic aspects of the Foraker Law that would benefit Puerto Rico over the countries that lacked a formal form of association. Among the perceived advantages was free commerce and the partial devolution to the Puerto Rican Treasury of the earnings gathered from the sale of local products. The following day these terms were supported by the PPD's leadership, establishing the party's ideological tendency as one of support to a form of association that relied on reclaiming the national sovereignty of Puerto Rico. That same year, Fernós was elected Resident Commissioner for the PPD and began promoting that Puerto Rico reclaimed its sovereignty from the United States Congress, while also conserving an economic link between both. Once in Washington, he created friendships with several Congressmen and functionaries of the United States Department of the Interior (DOI), which went on to become influential allies.

While in office, the appointment of Mariano Villaronga to the office of Commissioner of Instruction of Puerto Rico. This took place while the pro-statehood factions argued that the public education should be in English in order to facilitate a future admission. (Note: While the term "statehood" is often used when referring to a sovereign state, in Puerto Rico it refers to those that pursue the integration to the United States.) However, Villaronga supported the use of the established Spanish language. Understanding the implications that this had on the status of Puerto Rico, Fernós sided with Villaronga, noting that conserving the Spanish language played a key role in conserving the Puerto Rican cultural identity. His arrival also coincided with the proposal of Public Law 362, which amended the Jones Law to allow Puerto Ricans the right to elect their own governor. Fernós firmly supported these initiatives, believing that it was instrumental towards establishing a sovereign constitution in the near future and played a key role in its approval, turning Puerto Rico into the first territory to democratically elect a governor. While remaining Muñoz's main contact in Washington, Fernós also developed an interest in the process that created an Organic Act for Guam, a long-standing military possession with parallels to his own case. He pushed status language that would later be used as precedent when attending Puerto Rico's status. Between 1945 and 1950, Fernós modified his status proposal a total of 28 times. His efforts were supported by a parallel initiative undertaken by the DOI that tried to harmonize the public policy on territories with the anti-colonialism treaties that the United States reached with the United Nations.

Fernós coincided with most of what the DOI proposed, but refused the imposition of organic laws approved by Congress, believing that the political organization of the territories was an internal affair that must be based on the recognition of their respective sovereignties. In a 1947 draft titled "An act to establish the People of Puerto Rico as a self-governing community", Fernós included language that would exclude Puerto Rico from the Laws of Cabotage. On August 5, 1947, the Butler-Crawford Elective Governor Law was approved, allowing Puerto Rico the option to democratically elect a governor for the first time since the United States invaded. Muñoz Marín became the one elected in representation of the PPD. Fernós argued that these changes were insufficient, citing that the Organic Act that allowed Congress to nullify local laws should be abolished and that only the Federal Laws that benefited Puerto Rico should apply locally. He subsequently stated that these changes were only a return to the degree of self-government previously granted by the Carta Autonómica (lit. "Autonomous Charter") approved by Spain in 1897. Additionally, he demanded the democratization of other institutions that remained under federal jurisdiction and that the control of aduanas was transferred to the Puerto Rican Treasury.

Fernós continued his pursuit of sovereignty by pursuing the creation of a local Constitution that was completely redacted, lacking "colonial vestiges" including unwanted Federal Laws, unmodified and presented by democratically elected representatives of the Puerto Rican people, with the support of the popular vote. A local Constitution would also be a cornerstone of an adequate form of association and so was the establishment of local self-government via the democratic election of a governor. However, these would only serve as steps towards the final goal of reclaiming the national sovereignty of Puerto Rico. The following year, he noted that the will of most Puerto Ricans was to create a system that would erase all vestiges of colonialism. Fernós called his vision commonwealth soberano (lit. "sovereign commonwealth"), a midpoint status that he expected would "liquidate" the colonial regimen and perfect the economic relation between Puerto Rico and the United States. The Constitution drafted by the Puerto Ricans would be considered an "Organic Pact" that could only be modified via mutual consent. On August 15, 1948, the PPD officially adopted the organization of a Constituent Assembly as part of its government program. Shortly afterwards, Fernós appeared in a radio broadcast explaining his proposal, claiming that full independence was not possible at the moment due to opposition in Congress and that statehood would be impossible for a prolonged time period. He once again discussed the relation existing between the United Kingdom and the Commonwealth realms and argued in favor of a similar relationship between Puerto Rico and the United States.

Of particular interest to Fernós was the elimination of the Cabotage laws. This coincided with the Truman administration's adoption of Article 73 of the Charter of the United Nations, an initiative that pursued the self-determination for the territories that lacked self-government. The 1948 general elections took on a plebiscitary approach and saw Muñoz Marín support Fernós' proposal to pursue a relation similar to the Commonwealth realms, although, he noted that it should only serve as a transition for independence or incorporation. However, taking inspiration on Thomas Jefferson's Northwest Ordinance, the party's president also wished to launch a project containing disposition and articles in the nature of a "compact", "forever to remain unalterable unless by common interest", a language that he added to Fernós's proposal. During the final months of 1949, Fernós discussed the final version of his project with Muñoz and the following year, the document was reviewed by a PPD Committee. The project underwent one final revision before being formally presented to the United States House of Representatives. However, during the subsequent process the draft bill was dissected and underwent a series of complete revisions to the draft, which took place at the Mayflower hotel. There, Fernós took a cautious approach, focusing on the initial approval of the bill.

After approaching the members of several Congressional committees and sub-committees, he presented H.R. 7674 on March 13, 1950. After another revision, the bill was unanimously approved in the US Senate and received the opposition of Rep. Vito Marcantonio in the US House. Marcantonio remained its most vocal opposition, arguing that in practice Congress was not really granting Puerto Rico the complete sovereignty required to vanquish its colonial status. On the other hand, Fernós felt that if Congress could return full sovereignty to the Philippines, they could grant the partial sovereignty that his original proposal pursued to Puerto Rico, which in turn would voluntarily delegate the remainder. He conceded that in the heavily amended version, the majority of Puerto Rico's sovereignty would remain in Congress as established in the Treaty of Paris. However, he still believed that the sovereignty gained by the United States through the Treaty of Paris was still limited, since he considered that they could not surpass the control retained by Spain with the establishment of the 1876 Constitution and the 1897 Charter of Autonomy.

Truman signed the bill on July 3, 1950, and it became Public Law 600, which was approved in a referendum the following year and officially adopted as the Constitution of Puerto Rico. The degree of sovereignty acquired by Puerto Rico -if any- became a hot topic among local politicians. The process had damaged Fernós's proposal, with cornerstones such as a multilateral economy and exception from the Cabotage Laws being stripped by Congress. Muñoz considered that the law turned the semi-autonomous government was now the co-holder of said sovereignty. On July 3, 1951, the organization of a Constituent Convention was made official and Fernós was selected as its president. This process selected the two names for the political model that would be associated with the Constitution of Puerto Rico; in English the generic term "Commonwealth", in Spanish, the term Estado Libre Asociado (lit. " Freely Associated State") was selected, under the premise that no literal translation for "Commonwealth" exists in that language. On July 3, 1952, Truman signed Public Law 447 establishing the Commonwealth, which was inaugurated by Muñoz Marín 22 days later.

=== Failed attempts to secure sovereignty under the territorial clause ===
Conscious that the model approved by Congress diverted from his original creation by stripping it of sovereignty, Fernós pursued a series of amendments that would complete the "sovereign association" that he conceived. However, in the years leading to this development, Muñoz systematically moved away from the common ideology that had joined him with Fernós, eventually leading to a chism within the PPD that led to the exit of Vicente Géigel Polanco and the creation of the Puerto Rican Independence Party (PIP). In June 1946, Muñoz published an article titled "Nuevos caminos hacia viejos objetivos", which redefined his concepts of "liberty" and "sovereignty", the later of which he defined as a "union of forces that produce the real power [required] to execute the people's will".

This position began to establish an early contrast between him and Fernós, who believed that sovereignty was a key aspect of his project. However, both ideologies were able to survive in parallel for some time. Following the Jayuya Uprising, Muñoz's public postures hardened and took a turn towards conservativism. However, Fernós remained loyal to his liberal origins, likely beginning an ideological distancing, which was generally kept out of the public. The moves that followed were influenced by this breach, and were focused towards improving the level of sovereignty that Puerto Rico possessed. Despite considering it a transcendental accomplishment, Fernós was not satisfied with this version and had previously told Muñoz that, once approved, it would "almost immediately" require "scrutiny to perfect it".

His first proposal to change Law 600 was completed even before the model was implemented on March 27, 1952. Fernós idealized a plan that consisted of systematically improving the degree of sovereignty by presenting a series of projects in Congress, referring to this work as the "pursuit of [the model's] perfection". Fernós gained notoriety within Congress, also establishing a series of friendships with highly-influential congressmen, to whom he explained his pursuit of a form of sovereign association as the culmination of the Commonwealth's model. In 1953, Muñoz sent a letter to Truman arguing that the Commonwealth now possessed a complete form of self-government and requested that the case of Puerto Rico was removed from the United Nations' United Nations list of non-self-governing territories. A position supported by interim Secretary of Interior Vernon D. Northrop. Fernós, as the project's creator, served as Alternate Delegate of the United States at the UN's Non-Self-Governing Territories Commission while the situation was being overseen. Following a prolonged debate, the United States managed to convince the United Nations to remove Puerto Rico from the commission's scope with the argument that a new status -in association by mutual agreement [and] invested with political sovereignty – had been reached. Parallel to this, Fernós presented Joint Resolution 252 in the US House of Representatives, also known as the "Cosmetic Project", it was the first step to "perfect" his model. The bill intended to "fortify" the notion that Puerto Rico was no longer a territory or possession and directly focused in rewriting ambiguous sections of Public Law 600. The DOI supported it and so did the Congressional commissions that reviewed it. However, Muñoz suddenly ordered that it was removed from consideration.

After this development, Fernós and Muñoz held a series of conversations at Trujillo Alto, where their conflicting ideologies began to clash. These combined with strategic differences between both leaders, which only served to hindrance the "perfection of the association" as originally conceived. Matters were further complicated by the growing involvement of Muñoz's legal aides, José Trias Monge and Abe Fortas, who began taking over the legal aspect of the ideological definition. Fernós was affected by these developments, but nonetheless continued his pursuit to reach the full constitutional development of Puerto Rico's status through its sovereignty. Between 1954 and 1960, Fernós and several other figures realized a series if studies that intended to create a new project that would allow the Commonwealth to reach the development that he believed in. However, his involvement was often limited to his visits to Puerto Rico. In 1956, the PPD vowed to retake the status debate in order to "perfect" the Commonwealth. On March 23, 1959, H.R. 5926, colloquially known as the Fernós Project, was presented before the US House of Representatives as requested. After a sister project was presented in the US Senate by James E. Murray, the collective bills became known as the Fernós-Murray Project. This initiative intended to replace the Federal Relation Statute of Public Law 600 with a series of "association articles" and requested Congress to make it clear that Puerto Rico was no longer a territory or possession of the United States. The Fernós-Murray Project also included the multilateral economy, as stated in the original concept of the Estado Libre Asociado. Another straggled proposal that it intended to revive was the exclusion of Puerto Rico from the Cabotage laws.

The Fernós-Murray Project also presented the possibility that the Supreme Court of Puerto Rico could appeal directly to the United States Supreme Court. The bill was not well received, especially by the Federal military agencies and the Secretary of the Interior. The debate began in the United States House of Representatives' Committee of Interior and Insular Affairs led by US Rep. Wayne Aspinall. The US Senate was intending to wait the US House's analysis, a development that favored Fernós' strategy due to his reputation there. However, after the possibility of a pro-statehood referendum was considered, Muñoz decided to take a counterintuitive step and involved US Sen. Lyndon B. Johnson, leading to the Senate's action. By altering Fernós's strategy, the process took a turn to the worse, when it conflicted with US Sen. Henry M. Jackson, the congressman directly in charge of the debate status within the Senate. In the subsequent public hearings, Jackson went on to become the notable figure to notice that under the Commonwealth, Puerto Rico was still under the jurisdiction of the territorial clause, exposing the contradictions between this fact and the case that the United States had presented before the United Nations. Now aware of this position, Fernós reunited with Edward S. Corwin who offered a supporting opinion. Furthermore, a PPD reunion led by Muñoz further shifted the party's position to a more conservative posture, which was included in a revised bill that was presented before Congress in September 1959. This new posture, which discarded independence as a potential development and introduced an ambiguous support for future statehood "once the economic level matched that of other states", was responsible for introducing the term "permanent union" to the PPD's internal status debate and, as a direct consequence, began alienating Fernós and his vision of a sovereign development.

This decision was sorely taken by several members of the PPD due to its sudden turn towards the right and the term "permanent union" was criticized, being perceived as a synonym for "eventual statehood". Despite representing a significant conflict between his ideology and Muñoz's, Fernós reluctantly included this language to the revised bill. Despite representing a contrast to his own beliefs, he was involved in the process, spending hours on it. On the other hand, Muñoz's own posture became even more conservative, leading to an argument in favor of allowing the residents of the territories to vote for the President of the United States, an act that would require an amendment to the United States Constitution and also served as an indirect recognition that Puerto Rico was still under the territorial clause. This led to an unintentional debate, where the tax exemptions of Puerto Rico, when compared to other territories, became a hot topic. Muñoz responded that once the economy allowed it, Puerto Rico would contribute to the Federal Government like the incorporated jurisdictions. This argument, which would place the Commonwealth even closer to statehood, was opposed by Fernós, who claimed that the economic relation between both parts should be akin to that of two countries, and as such, it unnecessary for one to cost the government expenses for the other. While the bill stalled in Congress, a local referendum was proposed by Fernós with the intention of disabling the pro-statehood faction. The date of this referendum led to another conflict between both leaders and once again, the position of Muñoz prevailed.

Meanwhile, Fernós continued to work on the bill, gathering what he considered a positive outlook. However, Muñoz was bothered by a campaign launched by the pro-statehood Puerto Rican Republican Party criticizing it as "un-loyal, pro-independence [or] anti-american" and in a subsequent reunion suggested that the bill was completely ignored while that year's political campaign was underway. This represented yet another ideological difference between both. Fernós drafted another version, but this priority on revalidating proved to be responsible for the failure of the Fernós-Murray Project. On January 11, 1961, Muñoz requested that instead of continuing with this initiative, the Resident Commissioner was to present a different bill that eliminated the limitations on loan margins. Fernós was the last member involved in the status revision to be informed of this change in strategy, which had been idealized by Arturo Morales Carrión, a Puerto Rican that belonged to the United States delegation in the United Nations. This new initiative moved the focus away from Congress, the holder of Puerto Rico's sovereignty, to the executive power. The intention was to exploit the relation between Muñoz and the newly elected president John F. Kennedy, positioning Puerto Rico as a link between the United States and Latin America.

This was a reactive measure taken only six days after Prime Minister of the Soviet Union Nikita Khrushchev and President of Cuba Fidel Castro denounced that Puerto Rico remained a territory before the General Assembly of the UN. Fernós was excluded of the process and shortly afterwards, Muñoz made it clear that no further revisions of the status of Puerto Rico were planned in the near future. Despite this, the Resident Commissioner did present H.J.R. 124, requesting the elimination of the loan margin since it was something previously included in the Fernós-Murray Project. The development of the status now fell on an executive order that would explain the Kennedy administration's position on the Commonwealth equivalent to a "memorandum of understanding" and which would move Puerto Rico's case away from the DOI. The status strategy would now focus on two proposals, the Executive Order & Memorandum and the informal and secretive Presidential Commission. In a letter sent to Chester Bowles, Muñoz admitted that the idea behind this strategy was not to actually change the status of Puerto Rico, but instead to disable the argument that Puerto Rico remained a colony, one that was "a weapon freely used by Communists, Fidelistas and enemies of the United States".

=== Muñoz, Fernós and the demand for sovereignty ===
However, this campaign did no go as expected, the Legal Adviser of the Department of State did not support the notion that the Commonwealth could be an "inalterable pact" that could only be modified by mutual consent, recognizing the fact that Congress -as the holder of Puerto Rico's sovereignty- was capable of doing so unilaterally. This development triggered a sharp turn in Muñoz's ideology and strategy, which would lead to efforts to ensure that the Commonwealth's development was to be through its full sovereignty. This placed him in the same line of Fernós for the first time in years. The strategy of both leaders would now be focused on acquiring concrete changes, instead of pushing partial measures. On February 10, 1961, Fernós noted that the Commonwealth, as it stood, had an absence of democracy and shortly afterwards created another plan in line with the Fernós-Murray Project. Despite all if the failed efforts, he still believed that the Commonwealth should mirror the relation of Canada and the United Kingdom and this was the right time to launch a pro-sovereignty campaign. The new plan became known as the Aspinall Project and its main key difference to the Fernós-Murray Project was that in order to be implemented, the Senate was to renounce to all of the Commonwealth's sovereignty, resulting in the momentary creation of a Republic of Puerto Rico, which would then negotiate with Congress directly. This concept, known then as the "culminated" or "perfected Estado Libre Asociado" was consistent with the definition of free association approved by the United Nations on December 14, 1960, through UN General Assembly Resolution 1514 (XV). However, the inclusion of statehood as an option in the referendum contemplated in the project did not sit well with Fernós.

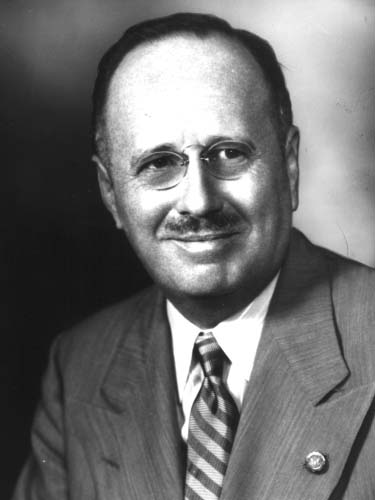
Dr. Antonio Fernós-Isern

The failure of the Bay of Pigs Invasion further complicated matters with the United States military, which was now focusing on reinforcing its presence in Puerto Rico. The United States Department of Defense became involved, requesting that even if Puerto Rico acquired the sovereignty desired, the military was to retain the capability of expropriating terrains that they considered strategic granted by the pre-existing eminent domain. Furthermore, there were plans to expand the United States Navy's presence in the municipalities of Vieques and Culebra. Despite attempts by the Puerto Rican government to moderate this, the Navy's plan went ahead unaltered. The process to launch the informal Presidential Commission was underway and the first version drafted by a group led by Muñoz completely abandoned the "permanent union" proposed years before, now adopting a "permanent association based on Puerto Rico's sovereignty". On the other hand, the governor also tried to prevent that the case of Puerto Rico was once again discussed before the General Assembly of the United Nations. This effort was led by Vicente Maura and Laura Meneses de Albízu in representation of Cuba. Muñoz felt that the Caribbean crisis could stagnate the project, but nonetheless favored its presentation. The draft discussed officially introduced the acts of sovereignty transfer and subsequent association as a simultaneous process.

In January 1962, Arturo Morales Carrión published an analysis arguing that the "free association" purported by Public Law 600 had to be re-examined due to having its origin in the obsolete laws of 1900 and 1917, also supporting the integration of Puerto Rico to the international community. In the following process, Muñoz would frequently employ the terms "sovereignty and association" to explain the goal of the project, also making a differentiation between it and full independence. There was consensus surrounding the demand for sovereignty, however, Fernós felt that presenting all of their demands at once would present a high degree of complexity that could risk its approval in Congress, instead supporting a more concise approach. When the Puerto Rican and United States delegations met at the commission, this concern was proven true. Despite the fact that efforts were done to inform the Americans of the steps planned, when both sides met their lack of awareness regarding the status of Puerto Rico was made apparent. Before a second set of reunions took place in Puerto Rico, Fernós authored an analysis that tried to educate their counterparts. He and José Trias Monge pushed a two-stage process which would first acquire the sovereignty from Congress and would later employ it in a referendum, which would also include independence and statehood. After more changes were done to the language of the draft, the Puerto Rican delegation appeared ready to defend its initiative. The subsequent reunions led to a profound discussion, where the ambiguity of the territorial Commonwealth was noted by Harold R. Reis who was the American in charge of overseeing defense and economic relations.

The Puerto Rican delegation made it clear that their intention was to gain the sovereignty of Puerto Rico and employ it to enter into an association with the United States, also expressing its intention to create its own exterior relations and join international organizations. Before the next reunion, several drafts were made and Muñoz presented them to presidential aides. After reading the drafts, Kennedy recognized that the Commonwealth "relationship [as presented in 1952 was] not perfected" and also requested some revisions. During the tenth Anniversary of the Constitution, Muñoz complicated the PPD's strategy by involving the Puerto Rican legislature and a local referendum, a step that frustrated Fernós. This sudden decision had more side effects in Congress, where several legislators began questioning both the action that enabled Public Law 600 and a move towards association, which was called "sweetened independence" by opposers. Shortly afterwards, Muñoz took a sudden reactionary decision to qualm the claims of independence and reconsidered the term "permanent union" and the proposal supporting presidential vote, adding them the project despite the direct contradiction between these and any form of sovereign association. Fernós believed this to be a serious mistake. Muñoz further complicated the proposal in an effort to calm the opposing pro-statehood faction, now proposing two related referendums, the first asking for an endorsement of the revision of the Commonwealth and a second one after Congress evaluated the options.

Fernós was concerned that this would dilate the process, especially since he thought that Congress was unlikely to offer a compromise in a process that would include the consideration of statehood. Muñoz then suggested that they went directly to a plesbicite that only considered independence, statehood and a generic "Commonwealth". On August 16, 1962, PdC No. 616 which adopted the governor's idea was presented in the Puerto Rico House of Representatives. Fernós criticized the fact that the bill lacked the elements of the development that they had proposed towards a sovereign association; the referendum had been turned into a straw poll. This presented a notable contrast to what had been accorded with the Kennedy administration. After the project went to public hearings, Hiram Torres Rigual and Juan Manuel García Passalacqua presented Muñoz with an analysis of the deponent arguments which focused on the recognition of the sovereignty and the opposition to the presidential vote. Despite his disdain towards the way that the issue was being attended, Fernós attempted to harmonize the local and federal processes. This bill was eventually removed and replaced with another. Parallel to this, the members of the informal Commission continued their research for a bill that developed the current status.

=== Complications caused by Congress and Cold War ===
However, Reis' subsequent visit coincided with the Cuban Missile Crisis. With the sudden complication of the Cold War, Puerto Rico's role in the defense plan of the United States military was emphasized. This would have an impact in the negotiations, with Reis noting his concern about the implications that it would carry for defense and public policy. He recommended that all of the ideas were gathered in a draft. The document was completed by Trías Monge and opened by stating "the United States of America hereby relinquishes its sovereign rights in and to Puerto Rico and the adjacent islands and waters referred to in Article II of the Treaty of Peace signed at Paris on December 10, 1898, and proffers the following Articles of Compact as the basis of the association between the United States and Puerto Rico." No longer were the ambiguous term "permanent union" or the possibility of a presidential vote present. A stage-bases process reminiscent of the one once proposed by Fernós was also suggested in a note. However, Muñoz had another plan and requested the creation of other drafts, which despite being in part authored by Fernós, now proposed that the initiatives were going to be presented in Congress before they were voted by the citizens of Puerto Rico. Before these were complete, the governor gave in to the demands of the Puerto Rico Republican Party and discarded using them, instead presenting his own draft which was further amended by the pro-statehood faction. This was considered a major victory for the integrationist party, who demanded and accomplished the re-inclusion of "permanent union" and the presidential vote, expecting that due to the consequent contradictions and the fact that Congress was unwilling to compromise before a popular vote the project would fail.

The product of this reunion was the one used in the final version of Joint Resolution No.1 of December 3, 1962. Aware that the amendments of pro-statehood group would virtually guarantee its failure in Congress, Fernós expressed inconformity about these changes. Muñoz reunited with all Puerto Rican members of the informal Commission and developed a strategy known as Operación ELA, which attended all sorts of concerns that had appeared among Congressmen, from several inmovilistic arguments to the farfetched the possibility of "a communist advance". The implantation of this initiative included a supportive presidential message as well as several visits to members of Congress, journalists and even Nelson Rockefeller, all in an attempt to gain a positive outlook. In the second reunion of Operación ELA, Muñoz introduced a position paper that was not well received by Fernós, who once again reaffirmed that the goal was a "permanent association", since "permanent union" implied integration to the United States. The process was further dilated when the informal Commission suggested that the recommendations should be presented to the president before Congress. Muñoz consented, despite the protests of Trías, who argued that the Joint Resolution stated otherwise. As a consequence, another Presidential Commission was to be created, the Status Commission, with only minor involvement from Congress. In a reunion with president Kennedy, Muñoz admitted that the presidential vote was not really important to him. Aspinall joined Fernós in believing that the project was becoming too complex and that would guarantee its failure in Congress.

In February 1963, members of Operación ELA held another reunion and the document that emerged from it applied the modifications proposed by the statehood movement but retained Fernós' postures regarding sovereignty and association. The Resident Commissioner presented this draft to Aspinall, eventually reaching Reis, who presented a series of drafts. The third of these reached Fernós and its liberal postures were consonant with his own, and he went on to analyze it and propose his own changes. Following extensive debate, the proposal was ultimately presented by Aspinall and received the code H.R. 5945. However, the evaluation process of the preliminary proposals was rocky and earned the critics of key figures such as US Sen. Henry M. Jackson. At the urgency of US Rep. Leo W. O'Brien, a member of the United States House Committee on Insular Affairs, who suggested it as a strategy to "facilitate" the approval of the project, Muñoz and Fernós had decided to temporarily put aside the demand of sovereignty. Both Aspinall and O'Brien claimed that the final revision would be clear to include this aspect. However, this did not happen. Fernós was forced to reluctantly accept a replacement -"inherent right and juridic capacity to enter into compacts"- in order to keep the proposal alive. As was the case when confronted with previous strategic obstacles, Muñoz distanced himself from the demand of sovereignty. His use of the term "permanent union" led to a confusion among Congressmen, who believed that only statehood could offer such option.

However, this backfired when the PR Republican Party changed its posture and focused on attacking the Commonwealth and its possibilities of development. In representation of the Kennedy administration, Harold Seidman also warned against the use of the term "permanent union". Despite receiving some bipartisan support, H.R. 5945 experienced a problematic course in the US House, stalling for five months. The actions of Reis himself began indicating that he favored a change of strategy. Due to the failure of the complex version of the project, "brief" substitutive versions were presented, also officializing the inauguration of the Status Commission, a process led by the Resident Commissioner. Local politics saw the emergence of the reformist faction named Grupo de los 22 (lit. "The Group of the 22") within the PPD. The group pursued the reorganization of the PPD's structure and proposed several changes to the economic model. Despite its name, the group was large and included both liberals an conservatives. The faction was led by Juan Manuel Garcia Passalacqua, who since 1957 had been working on his own free association model. Other member include Severo Colberg Ramirez, Victoria Muñoz Mendoza, José Arsenio Torres, Rafael Hernández Colón, Marco Rigau, Samuel Silva Gotay and Noel Colón Martinez. The Grupo de los 22 was bold in its approach, first sending a letter to Muñoz asking him to abandon the candidature for governor and to help bring forth a change in generation.

While the faction clashed directly with the older members of the party, Muñoz was open to their proposals, including some in his final speech as governor titled El proposito de Puerto Rico (lit. "The purpose of Puerto Rico"). Feeling that the status issue was not advancing, the group drafted a proposal pursuing free association as defined in UN General Assembly Resolution 1514, which they intended to be included in the party's platform for the 1964 General Elections. On April 13, 1964, the participation of a Puerto Rican delegation within the commission was made official. However, Fernós did not participate in the nomination of candidates nor participated as an active member. Leaving a protect that promised to eliminate "all colonial vestiges", he decided not to pursue the re-election for the office of Resident Commissioner. Instead he opted to occupy an at-large seat in the Senate of Puerto Rico for the next four years. The project failed to provide any significant advances towards the resolution of the status of Puerto Rico and during the following years, the only notable action taken would be a non-binding referendum that did not produce any long-term reaction from Congress. On January 19, 1974, Fernós died disappointed at the fact that he could not see the culmination of the sovereign association that he once visualized.

== Footnotes ==
=== Bibliography ===
- Roberto Colón Ocasio (2009). Antonio Fernós – Soberanista, Luis Muñoz Marín – Autonomista: Divergencias ideológicas y su efecto en el desarrollo del Estado Libre Asociado de Puerto Rico (in Spanish). Ediciones Puerto. p. 138. ISBN 978-1934461662.
