= José M. Saldaña =

Puerto Rican academic

President of the University of Puerto Rico
- In office 1988–1992
- Preceded by: Arturo Morales Carrión
- Succeeded by: Norman Maldonado

Personal details
- Born: Santurce, Puerto Rico
- Education: University of Puerto Rico (BA); University of Puerto Rico School of Dental Medicine (DMD)

Military service
- Allegiance: United States
- Branch/service: United States Air Force
- Rank: Captain

José Manuel Saldaña Sepúlveda is a Puerto Rican academic who served as president of the University of Puerto Rico during the 1980s.

== Biography ==
Saldaña was born in Santurce, Puerto Rico. Graduated from University High School, before obtaining his bachelor, masters in Biology at the University of Puerto Rico Faculty of Natural Sciences Río Piedras campus and his Doctor of Dental Medicine degree at the University of Puerto Rico School of Dental Medicine. He is a member of Phi Sigma Alpha fraternity. As a professor at the School of Dentistry he soon became one of the leaders at the Faculty and was appointed Director of Department. When a vacancy arose at the Dean of the School of Public Health of the Medical Sciences Campus, he was appointed Dean. From 1973 to 1976, she was prominent in the Department of Health as in charge of Oral Health. In 1976, he completed his work in the Department of Health and returned to the University as professor of Dentistry.

Served in United States Air Force during the Vietnam conflict and he was assigned to Westover Air Force Base located in Massachusetts, where he served for two years and in which he also did his internship. Finish his military service as captain in 1964.

As vice president of Igualdad, Futuro Seguro, a pro-statehood organization created by Hernán Padilla in 2011, Saldaña testified on the organization's behalf before the United Nations Decolonization Committee in 2013.

Saldaña is a frequent op-ed contributor at El Vocero.

== See also ==
- University of Puerto Rico

Academic offices
Preceded by Arturo Morales Carrión	President of the University of Puerto Rico; 1988–1992	Succeeded by Norman Maldonado
