= Jorge Haddock Acevedo =

20th President of the University of Puerto Rico

- Haddock in 2019
- Born: 15 August 1955 (age 71); Caguas, Puerto Rico
- Education: University of Puerto Rico at Mayaguez (BEng) (1978); Rensselaer Polytechnic Institute (MEM) (1979); Purdue University (Ph.D) (1981)
- Occupation: University president
- Known for: Academic administration
- Title: President of the University of Puerto Rico
- Term: 2018–2021

Academic background
- Thesis: Energy Planning for Puerto Rico: A Systems Modeling Approach (1981)
- Doctoral advisor: Frederick T. Sparrow
- Other advisors: A. Alan B. Pritsker; A. Ravindran; Wally Tyner

Academic work
- Discipline: Engineering
- Sub-discipline: Industrial Engineering
- Institutions: Clemson University; Rensselaer Polytechnic Institute; University of Richmond; George Mason University; University of Massachusetts Boston; University of Puerto Rico
- Website: President's Page

Signature
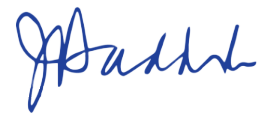

Jorge Haddock Acevedo

President of the University of Puerto Rico
- In office 4 September 2018 – 31 July 2021
- Appointed by: Board of Governos of the University of Puerto Rico
- Preceded by: Uroyoán Walker
- Succeeded by: Luis Ferrao

Jorge Haddock (Acevedo) (Spanish: [ˈxoɾxe ˈxaðok aseˈβeðo]; born 15 August 1955) is an American academic administrator and professor. H was president of the University of Puerto Rico from 2018 to 2021 and has worked at the University of Massachusetts Boston, George Mason University, the University of Richmond, and Rensselaer Polytechnic Institute.

== Early life and education ==
Jorge Haddock was born to his father of the same name and Francisca Acevedo, in Caguas, Puerto Rico on 15 August 1955. Haddock has two siblings, one of which is the actress Gilda Haddock. His mother, who held a master's degree, later divorced and raised her three children as a single mother with help of her father, Pedro "Don Peyo" Acevedo. On 7 June 1980 he married María de los Ángeles Valentín Díaz. They have two children.

Haddock earned a Bachelors of Science in Civil Engineering from the University of Puerto Rico - Mayaguez in May 1978. The following May he obtained a master's degree in Management Engineering from the Rensselaer Polytechnic Institute, followed by a PhD in Industrial Engineering from Purdue University in 1981 while simultaneously being an industrial engineering assistant professor in his baccalaureate alma mater.

== Academic career ==
Haddock began his academic career at the University of Puerto Rico, where he served as an assistant professor of industrial engineering from 1981 to 1984. From 1984 and 1986 Haddock was an assistant professor of industrial engineering at Clemson University.

In 1986, Haddock joined Rensselaer Polytechnic Institute as an assistant professor. He held successive positions in industrial engineering and decision sciences until 1996 when he was appointed professor of decision sciences and engineering systems. In 1999 he was he was appointed as professor at Rensselaer’s Lally School of Management and Technology, and later, in 2003, its associate dean. From 2005 to 2009, Haddock was appointed dean and professor of the Robins School of Business, of the University of Richmond.

In 2009 he was appointed as dean and professor of the then George Mason University School of Management the former position he held until 2014. In 2014 he was named dean and professor of the University of Massachusetts Boston's School of Management, where he worked until 2018.

== President of the University of Puerto Rico ==
In 2018 he was unanimously selected by the Board of Governors of the University of Puerto Rico to be President of the university system.

His annual salary of $240,000, caused much controversy since the wage ceiling has been $105,000 since 1997; additionally he was provided with a stipend ceiling of $5,000 for relocalization purposes.

He had to manage large budget cuts imposed by the Financial Oversight Management Board (FOMB) which would reduce the state's contributions to the university budget of $1,347 million (2018) by $243 million by 2023. One of his major accomplishements was to regain the Middle States accreditation. All university campused were on probation when he assumed the presidency after the financial disclosures had been delayed, jeopardizing re-accreditation of some of the campuses or even the university as a whole.

In June 2019, MSCHE reaffirmed accreditation for all eleven campuses and ended the process, while requesting a supplementary report monitoring the university's financial statements.

In March 2020, in response to the COVID-19 pandemic, the university moved its in-person courses to remote instruction. According to a report Haddock presented to the Puerto Rico governor-elect's transition committee in December 2020, more than 11,500 courses were modified in ten days, and six of the eleven units had received MSCHE authorization to offer distance programs. In May 2021, MSCHE approved the university's distance-learning offerings, allowing all campuses to offer remote programs from the August 2021 semester onward.

According to the same 2020 report, the university reduced its reliance on central government appropriations from 72 percent of its budget in fiscal year 2016–17 to 47 percent in 2020–21, through fiscal measures the report valued at about $1.5 billion and a reduction of roughly 1,200 full-time positions. The report stated that federal research funding rose from about $90 million to more than $115 million in fiscal year 2019–20 (about 22 percent), and that the Federal Emergency Management Agency had obligated $110.3 million for the university in fiscal year 2020.

In 2019 the administration introduced a new financial aid model; the report stated that tuition was covered for about 80 percent of undergraduate students. It also reported that the university received 13,024 applications from new students for 2020, of which 8,956 enrolled, and that the graduation rate rose from 42.7 percent in 2016–17 to 47.3 percent in 2019–20.

Further controversy arose after, in May 2019, Haddock ordered a stop to the eviction of Nelson Sambolín, an artist who had his workshop at the university headquarters at the San Juan Botanical Garden. It was revealed that Sambolín had a contract with the UPR between 2015 and 31 June 2017, when his contract expired, but the UPR continued making payments of $1,500 a month, without a contract, amounting to $10,500 by the time this was announced. Haddock claimed he was "proud" of Sambolin's work. His investiture ceremony, which took place on 13 June 2019, was also mired with controversy, since such a ceremony hadn't taken place since 1977 and protestors requested that the total cost of the ceremony be revealed, since it had been marketed as a "simple" event by the university. Haddock was criticized for allegedly "feeding his ego" and the ceremony as a whole was labelled as "shameful".

In October 2019, Haddock announced the possible closure of some campuses of the University due to proposed budget costs by the FOMB for the following fiscal and academic year. Allegedly, in a letter sent to the President of the Board of Governors in January 2020, he attempted to detain payments to employees of four campuses as required by law which had remained for two days during the preceding Fall Semester because of student protests against the budget costs.

=== Resignation ===
On July 7, 2021 the Board of Governors requested his resignation. Interim-Secretary of Education Eliezer Ramos Parés confirmed that he favored the resignation and that this was due in part to accreditation problems at the Medical Sciences Campus and other faculties.

== Research ==
His publications have addressed management education and business-school leadership as well as quantitative and analytical approaches to management. In 2007, he authored Creating Global Business Leaders: Business Education at the Intersection of Innovation, Technology, and Globalization, published by Aspatore Books.

== Awards and honors ==
Haddock has received a number of academic and professional honors:

- Tau Beta Pi, 1982.
- Special University Chapter Award, as faculty advisor to the Institute of Industrial Engineers (IIE) chapter at the University of Puerto Rico, 1982.
- Outstanding Young Industrial Engineer Award, IIE, 1990.
- Martin Luther King Jr. Award, Rensselaer Polytechnic Institute, 1992, for service to minority engineering students.
- Centennial Certificate, American Society for Engineering Education, 1993.
- David M. Darrin Counseling Award, Rensselaer Polytechnic Institute, 1993, for contributions to student counseling.
- Excellence for Minority Advancement Award, IIE, 1994.
- Teaching Award, Rensselaer Alumni Association, 1995.
- Outstanding Industrial Engineer Award, Edwardson School of Industrial Engineering, Purdue University, 2021.
- Distinguished Engineering Alumnus, Purdue University College of Engineering, 2025.

Academic offices
Preceded by Uroyoán Walker	President of the University of Puerto Rico; 2018–2021	Succeeded by Luis Ferrao
