= Norman Maldonado =

Puerto Rican politician and hematologist

President of the University of Puerto Rico
- In office 1993–2001
- Preceded by: José M. Saldaña
- Succeeded by: Antonio García Padilla

Personal details
- Born: 3 November 1935 (age 90) Adjuntas, Puerto Rico
- Education: Polytechnic of San Germán (BA); University of Puerto Rico School of Medicine (M.D.)

Norman Maldonado (born 1935 in Adjuntas, Puerto Rico) is one of Puerto Rico's top hematologists and served as President of the University of Puerto Rico (UPR).

He studied elementary school in Adjuntas and high school in Ponce, standing out as a committed student. He obtained with honors the Bachelor of Arts at the Polytechnic of San Germán and a doctorate in Medicine at the University of Puerto Rico School of Medicine, carved with the highest honor of being the first of its class.

In 1992, during his presidency, he also chaired the pro-statehood New Progressive Party's platform-drafting committee. In the years following the election, he helped the governor Pedro Rosselló to initiate the reform of Puerto Rico's health system. Since 2005, he has published numerous columns for The San Juan Star newspaper, many of them documenting Puerto Rico's medical history.

The Puerto Rico Senate recently passed a bill naming the Puerto Rico Medical Center's University Hospital after Dr. Maldonado, the only medical doctor to have held the post of UPR President.

A native of the mountain town of Adjuntas, he is married to Mary Anne Maldonado, a well known feminist and social activist, and has five grown-up children and six grandchildren.

Academic offices
Preceded by José M. Saldaña	President of the University of Puerto Rico; 1993–2001	Succeeded by Antonio García Padilla
