= Amador Cobas =

Puerto Rican academic administrator

President of the University of Puerto Rico
- In office 1971–1973
- Preceded by: Jaime Benitez
- Succeeded by: Arturo Morales Carrión

Personal details
- Born: August 2, 1910 Juncos, Puerto Rico
- Died: 1988
- Education: University of Puerto Rico (BA); Columbia University (MA, Ph.D)

Amador Cobas (born 2 August 1910, Juncos, Puerto Rico – died 1988) was a Puerto Rican physicist, academic administrator, and former President of the University of Puerto Rico (UPR). He was renowned for pioneering Puerto Rico's nuclear research and advancing science education on the island.

== Early life and education ==
Amador Cobas was born on 2 August 1910 in Juncos, Puerto Rico. He earned a **B.A. in Physics** from the University of Puerto Rico Río Piedras campus in 1931. He then studied at the **University of Paris** (1932–33) and later received an **M.A. and Ph.D. in Physics** from Columbia University in 1940. In 1942, he was announced as a Guggenheim Fellow. He was a member of Phi Sigma Alpha Fraternity.

== Scientific and academic career ==
Cobas was a key figure in establishing nuclear science in Puerto Rico. From 1950 to 1956, he directed the **Cosmic Ray Project** at UPR. In 1957, he founded the **Puerto Rico Nuclear Center** in collaboration with the United States Atomic Energy Commission and spearheaded isotopic and radioisotope research across multiple campuses.

He also led Puerto Rico’s Solid State Physics research on radiation effects in organic crystals at the Nuclear Center.

Cobas held a professorship in Physics and served as Dean of General Studies at UPR. He was awarded a **John Simon Guggenheim Fellowship** in 1942 for his research in theoretical physics.

== University leadership ==
On 7 January 1971, Cobas was appointed **President of the University of Puerto Rico**, serving until 1973. His tenure was marked by administrative friction: shortly after the UPR Board of Trustees approved the budget, his leadership faced significant opposition and led to his dismissal by the Council on Higher Education in 1972.

== Death ==
Amador Cobas passed away in 1988 at the age of 77.

== Honors and legacy ==
Cobas is remembered as a pioneering physicist who brought nuclear science to Puerto Rico and helped shape its scientific institutions. His establishment of the Nuclear Center and leadership in physics education laid foundational groundwork for research and academic development on the island.

== See also ==
- List of Puerto Ricans

Academic offices
Preceded by Jaime Benítez	President of the University of Puerto Rico; 1971–1973	Succeeded by Arturo Morales Carrión
