= Uroyoán Walker =

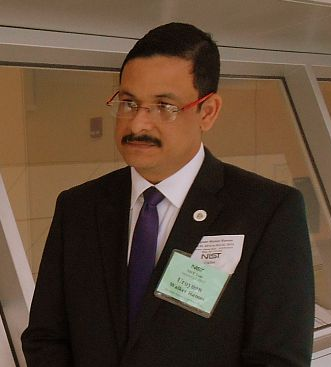
- Walker in 2016
- Education: University of Puerto Rico at Mayagüez (BA); Louisiana State University (MA, Ph.D)

Academic background
- Thesis: On K-Conjugacy Classes of Maximal Tori in SemiSimple Algebraic Groups. (2001)

Uroyoán Ramón Emeterio Walker Ramos (Note: In this Spanish name, the first or paternal surname is Walker and the second or maternal family name is Ramos.) (born in Brooklyn, New York) is a mathematician, college professor, and former President of the University of Puerto Rico (UPR). He completed a bachelor's degree in mathematics at the University of Puerto Rico, Mayaguez Campus (UPRM), and a master's and Ph.D. both from Louisiana State University. Before his appointment as president he served at several roles including as associate dean of administrative affair at UPRM, associate director for graduate studies at UPRM, academic senator, and member of the board of trustees of the whole UPR system. He was removed from office by the Board of Trustees amid cronyism scandals regarding institutional scholarships.

== Notes ==
Academic offices
Preceded by Miguel A. Muñoz	President of the University of Puerto Rico; 2013–2016	Succeeded by Jorge Haddock Acevedo
