= University of Puerto Rico =

Main public university system of Puerto Rico

Coordinates: 18°24′11″N 66°03′02″W

- Seal of the University of Puerto Rico
- Former names: Escuela Normal (Normal school)
- Type: Public
- Established: 1903; 123 years ago
- Academic affiliations: Sea-grant, Space-grant
- Budget: $1.52 billion (2014) (Note: López (2014; in Spanish) "El presupuesto actual consolidado de la institución es de $1,522 millones.")
- President: Zayira Jordán Conde
- Academic staff: 4,448
- Administrative staff: 11,178
- Students: 44,233
- Location: San Juan, Puerto Rico
- Campus: 11 campuses
- Website: upr.edu

University of Puerto Rico system campus locations

The University of Puerto Rico (Spanish: Universidad de Puerto Rico; often shortened to UPR) is the main public university system in the U.S. Commonwealth of Puerto Rico. It is a government-owned corporation with 11 campuses and approximately 44,200 students and approximately 4,450 faculty members. UPR has the largest and most diverse academic offerings in the commonwealth, with 472 academic programs of which 32 lead to a doctorate.

== History ==
In 1900, at Fajardo, the Escuela Normal Industrial (normal school) was established as the first higher education center in Puerto Rico. Its initial enrollment was 20 students and 5 professors. The following year it was moved to Río Piedras. On March 12, 1903, the legislature authorized founding of the University of Puerto Rico, and that day the "Escuela Normal" was proclaimed as its first department. As new schools began being built to mimic those in the United States, the UPR emerged as the main center to train teachers well versed in English to further the Americanization project.

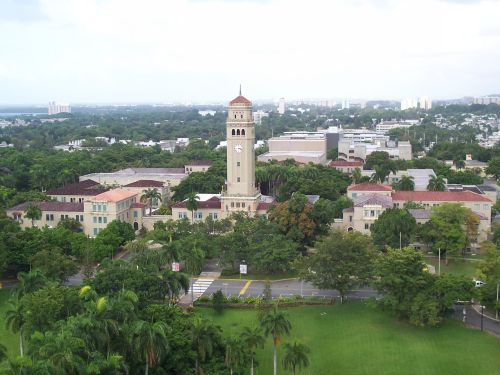
Aerial view of the Río Piedras Campus

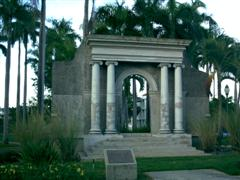
Portico of the Mayagüez Campus (RUM)

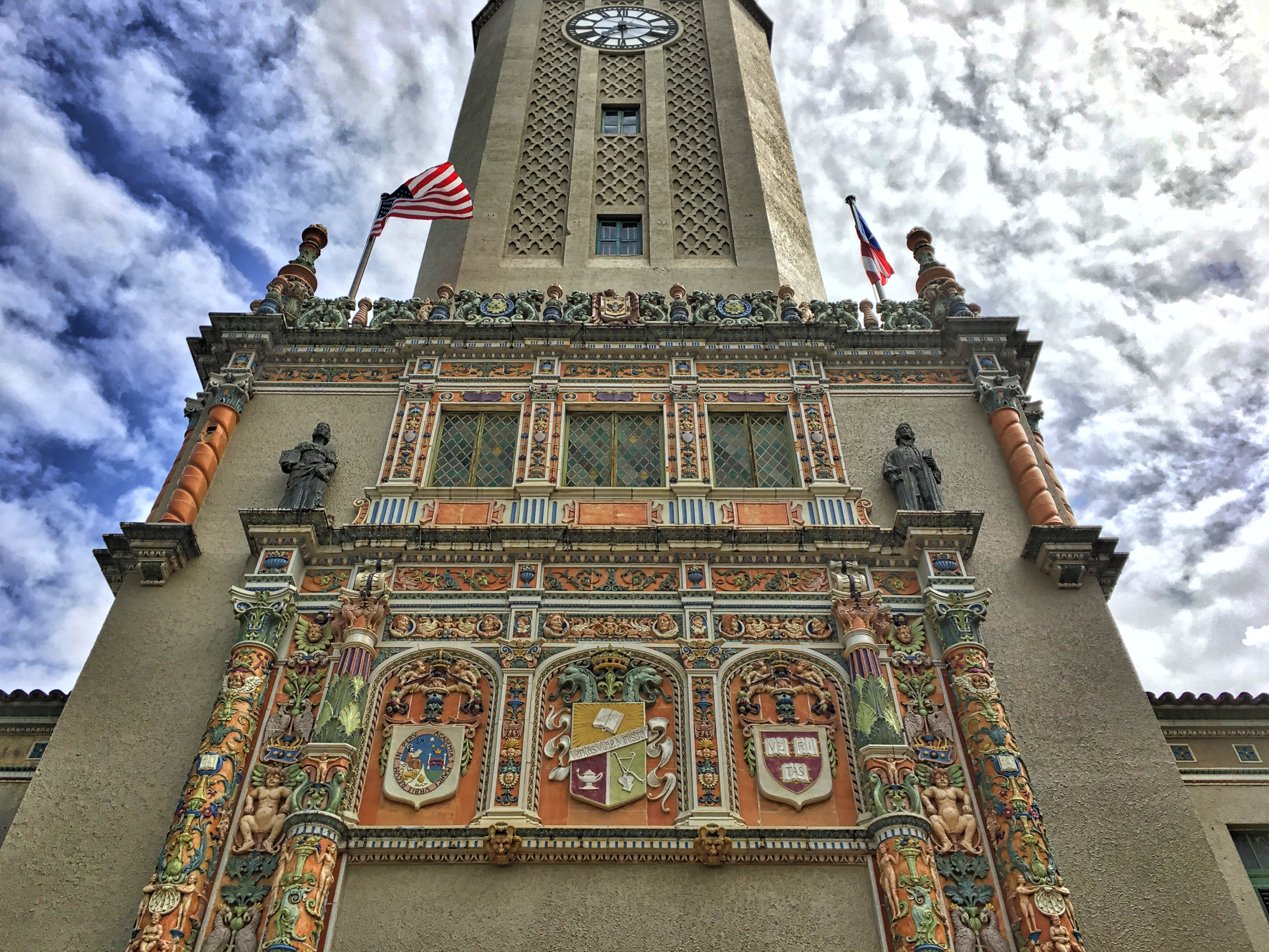
Roosevelt Tower at University of Puerto Rico, Río Piedras, based on the Giralda in Seville, includes the emblems both of Harvard University—the oldest in the United States—and University of San Marcos—the oldest in the Americas.

In 1908, the Morrill-Nelson Act was extended to Puerto Rico, making the university a "Land Grant College," which authorizes the use of federal land to establish colleges of agriculture, science and engineering. Two years later, in 1910, the College of Liberal Arts was established and the year following that the College of Agriculture at Mayagüez came into being. In 1912, the name was changed to College of Agriculture and Mechanic Arts. In 1913, the Departments of Pharmacy and Law were established.

Following the approval of the University Act of 1923, the university reorganized administratively it independent Insular Department of Education, provides the Board of Trustees as the governing board, and make the position of Rector as the principal officer. In 1923, Lidio Cruz Monclova began offering Puerto Rican history and literature courses. Upon arriving from the RUM, where he taught Spanish language and literature, Rafael W. Ramírez de Arellano began teaching those courses at Río Piedras. In 1924, the administrative structure and identity of the University of Puerto Rico become independent from the Department of Public Instruction and the governor appointed the first Rector. In 1925, a Spanish Department was created and ascribed to the Summer School, with particular intent of teaching the language to the foreign professors that were arriving. In 1926, the School of Commerce (later School of Business Administration) and the School of Tropical Medicine were established.

In 1927, then rector Thomas E. Benner established the Department of Hispanic Studies, led by Federico de Onís. The Revista de Estudios Hispánicos began being published the following year. Antonio S. Pedreira, Ángel del Río, Concha Meléndez, Tomás Navarro Tomás and Margot Arce de Vázquez served as professors. That year, the Master of Arts in Hispanic Studies became the institution's first graduate program. The 1928 San Felipe Segundo hurricane struck the island of Puerto Rico and caused serious damage in the Río Piedras campus. Staff and faculty began a reconstruction effort.

In 1929, a Department of History and Social Sciences was created within the College of Arts and Sciences with Pilar Barbosa de Rosario as director. In 1932, rector Carlos Chardón organized a Committee of Publications. Chardón had an interest in developing archeologists, and he pushed Arturo Morales Carrión to go abroad and study anthropology, but the student declined. That year, the Alfa Fi Sigma fraternity was founded by a group of students that were against the use of initiation rituals by other fraternities. In 1933, several students joined strikes that were taking place within the tabaco and needlework industries.

In 1935, the U.S. Congress extended to Puerto Rico the benefits of Bankhead-Jones Act, which provided funding for research and the construction of more buildings. During the following years, major structures in Spanish Renaissance style were built in the quadrangle in Río Piedras, including buildings such as the Tower Theatre. In 1938, Augusto Rodríguez composed the music and lyrics Arriví Francisco's Alma Mater, the university anthem. Pedreira took over the role from Onís and remained as director of the Revista de Estudios Hispánicos until 1939. By that year, the UPR had increased its studen roll to 5,000 students. However, under rector Juan B. Soto, most of the directors were foreign and the institution was part of the Americanization effort of the colonial government, with most classes being taught in English. A number of local professors that sympathized with the administration also taught in English. The emergence of a Puerto Rican nucleus from within the UPR led to clashes, which reflected the political situation of Puerto Rico at large.

In 1940, professor of Hispanic studies Margot Arce de Vázquez and professor of social sciences Jaime Benítez participated in a debate where the former argued in favor of more investigations and publications, exchanges and other similar initiatives that included grants and a more strict path to become a professor while the latter argued against nationalism and in favor of his universalist views, placing Puerto Rico as part of the European cultural sphere. Between 1941 and 1942, Pedro Muñoz Amaro and Isidro Díaz López led the student council. Ricardo Alegría was secretary under them, while Marcos A. Ramírez and Quiñones Elías were also members. Act No. 135 of May 7, 1942, amendment to the university, created the Higher Education Council as the governing board of the institution and regulator of the higher education system in Puerto Rico. Under this model, the rector of the UPR was responsible for choosing a vicerector for the RUM and a board. That same year, Benítez was named rector.

The Tugwell Affair led to the creation of the Agrupación Reformista Universitaria by his supporters. As a response, Marcos A. Ramírez left the student council in protest. In 1943, the UPR's editorial was formally established under a board. Publications like Ámbito criticized the UPR for failing to help produce a "nativist intellectualism", while gossip magazine El Cuko (authored by José Luis Torregrosa and Germán Rieckhoff Sampayo) adopted a socialist approach and made demands to the administration. Another such publication was the newspaper La Torre. In 1947, the university received accreditation from the Middle States Association of Colleges and Schools. In 1947, Antonio J. Colorado became director of the editorial.

In 1953, a magazine named La Torre (with no relation to the newspaper of the same name) began being published. In 1954, the then-professor Alegría protested before the Consejo de Educación Superior how visiting professors were being given better privileges than the locals. Believing that Benítez requesting the maximum salary for all failed to properly compensate based on competency.

Vicente Geigel Polanco, who taught law and social sciences in the UPR, was a proponent of reform writing about it in the essays La reforma universitaria and El problema educativo. Act No. 1 of 1966, restructuring the university. The system change to three campuses-Río Piedras, Mayagüez and Medical Sciences. As a consequence, Benítez stopped being rector and instead served as president, holding the office until 1971. The following year several regional colleges were established: Arecibo, Cayey and Humacao. Five more were created in the following years: Ponce (1969), Bayamón (1971), Aguadilla (1972), Carolina (1973), and Utuado (1978). In 1979, WRTU began broadcasting from the Río Piedras campus.

Act No. 186 of August 7, 1998, provides for the gradual autonomy of regional schools as provided by the Board of Trustees, to lead to eleven autonomous units.

2010–2011 University of Puerto Rico strikes where a series of strikes which occurred as a result of administrative budget cuts and an attempt to impose an $800 quota for students.

July 2010, the Middle States Commission on Higher Education placed the accreditation of the university on probation citing concerns about shortfalls in the governance of the institution. By the end of 2011, all 11 campuses had regained full accreditation after demonstrating significant progress in this area.

2017 – The UPR's staff organized a strike in opposition to budget cuts proposed by the Financial Oversight and Management Board for Puerto Rico.

After the impact of Hurricane Maria the university suffered damages totaling over $175 million. The university system was still in the process of acquiring FEMA funding to repair damages and as a result still suffered from structural damage months after the hurricane. The hurricane also affected the process of accreditation since eight campuses where in non compliance according to of the Middle States Commission on Higher Education. The eleven campuses opened within two months of Hurricane Maria, offering a sense of structure and normalcy for professors and students.

2019– During Jorge Haddock tenure the university newspaper, Diálogo, after 32 years in print, was moved online and employees were laid off until only the editor and an assistant remained. They were reassigned, while the newspaper was moved from the central administration to the Arecibo campus.

2021 – In June the Financial Oversight and Management Board cut $94 million from the UPR budget which would have drastically affected the institutions ability to operate. The local government intervened and assigned the money necessary before the August semester commenced.

== Organization ==
=== Board of trustees ===
The board of trustees is the governing body of the University of Puerto Rico.

On April 30, 2013, governor Alejandro García Padilla signed into law Act 13 of 2014 enacted by the 17th Legislative Assembly. The act effectively replaced the incumbent board with an entirely new board. In 2017, the board was changed once again by governor Ricardo Rosselló.

=== Campuses ===
Campus	Municipality	Enrollment
University of Puerto Rico, Medical Sciences Campus	San Juan	2,657
University of Puerto Rico at Aguadilla	Aguadilla	2,018
University of Puerto Rico at Arecibo	Arecibo	2,868
University of Puerto Rico at Bayamón	Bayamón	3,025
University of Puerto Rico at Carolina	Carolina	2,533
University of Puerto Rico at Cayey	Cayey	2,291
University of Puerto Rico at Humacao	Humacao	2,634
University of Puerto Rico at Mayagüez	Mayagüez	10,071
University of Puerto Rico at Ponce	Ponce	2,206
University of Puerto Rico at Río Piedras	San Juan	13,599
University of Puerto Rico at Utuado	Utuado	331

=== Presidents ===
- 1966–1970: Jaime Benítez
- 1970–1973: Amador Cobas
- 1973–1976: Arturo Morales Carrión
- 1977–1984: Ismael Almodovar
- 1985–1990: Fernando Agrait
- 1990–1993: José M. Saldaña
- 1993–2001: Norman Maldonado
- 2001–2009: Antonio García Padilla
- 2010–2011: José Ramón de la Torre
- 2011–2013: Miguel A. Muñoz
- 2014–2016: Uroyoán Walker
- 2019–2021: Jorge Haddock Acevedo
- 2022-2025: Luis A. Ferrao
- 2025-now: Zayira Jordán Conde

=== Campus radio ===
The campus radio station is called "WRTU Radio Universidad de Puerto Rico", and it was established in 1980. This is a public radio station with diverse musical and news programming. Its broadcasts both in FM and online.

== Admissions ==
UPR has the highest selectivity index of all colleges and universities in Puerto Rico, it has also maintained a systemwide admission rate of 67% since 1997. Its enrollment rate has surpassed 90% during the past five academic years. In terms of tuition, the cost per credit is $157 per undergraduate credit and $300 per graduate credit. For perspective, in 2017 the undergraduate credit cost was $53 and the graduate credit cost was $172. The cost of undergraduate credit is expected to rise until it reaches $177 in 2027.

In recent years, the University of Puerto Rico has experienced a decrease in student enrollment numbers. According to the university's reports, during the academic year 2009-2010, a total of 52,791 students were enrolled across all campuses. However, by the academic year 2014-2015, this number had decreased to 47,314 students, and in the academic year 2022-2023, the university had an enrollment of 44,233 students across its 11 campuses.

== Research ==
The university has a classification of "R2: Doctoral Universities – High research activity".

On October 15, 2010, it was awarded over $25 million from the National Science Foundation (NSF) to support research in nanotechnology. The organization within the University of Puerto Rico impacted is called Puerto Rico EPSCoR (Experimental Program to Stimulate Competitive Research). Since its creation 24 years ago, Puerto Rico EPSCoR has received over $180 million from NSF, NASA, the U.S. Department of Energy, and the U.S. Department of Defense.

On August 24, 2020, the university announced ten investigations for preventing and mitigating the spread of COVID-19 as part of $1.7 million the institution received from the local government.

== Rankings and notable facts ==
University rankings

Global – Overall
- QS World: 801–1000
- THE World: 801–1000

Regional – Overall
- QS Latin America: 40

According to the QS world ranking 2022 published in 2021, the University of Puerto Rico ranks number 40 in Latin America having dropped from 37 in 2020, but still higher than previous rankings of 42 in 2018 and 62 in 2015.

As a system, the University of Puerto Rico placed in the 800–1000 bracket in the 2018 edition of QS World University Rankings. Times Higher Education also ranks it in the 801–1000 bracket in the world. UPR was ranked among the best 20 universities in Latin America by SCImago ranking in 2010. The University of Puerto Rico ranked 18th and University of Puerto Rico at Mayagüez ranked 78th by Webometrics in Latin America. The UPR is the number one university in the Caribbean according to Webometrics.

The system's only school of engineering at the Mayagüez campus is accredited by ABET and graduates more than 600 engineers per year. The school was chosen as the top engineering school for Hispanics by Hispanic Engineer & Information Technology Magazine.

In 2020 the director of NASA grant consortium in Puerto Rico doctor Gerardo Moller, stated that 25% of the Hispanic employees hired by NASA are graduates of the UPR.

Research activity, measured in terms of external funds received, has grown exponentially since 1985, doubling every five years. In 2007–2008 the UPR received over $87 million for research.

== Notable alumni ==
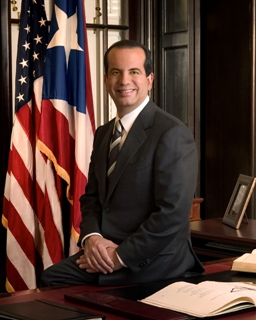
Aníbal Acevedo Vilá, (BA 1982, JD 1985), 8th governor of Puerto Rico (2005-2009), U.S. Representative (Resident Commissioner), D-Puerto Rico (2001-2004), State Representative, P.R. House of Representatives (1992-1999)

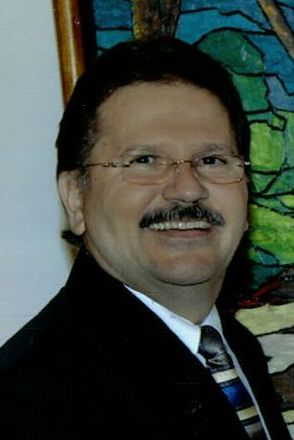
José Aponte, (BBA 1980), State Representative, Puerto Rico House of Representatives, (2001–present), 28th Speaker of the Puerto Rico House of Representatives (2005-2009)

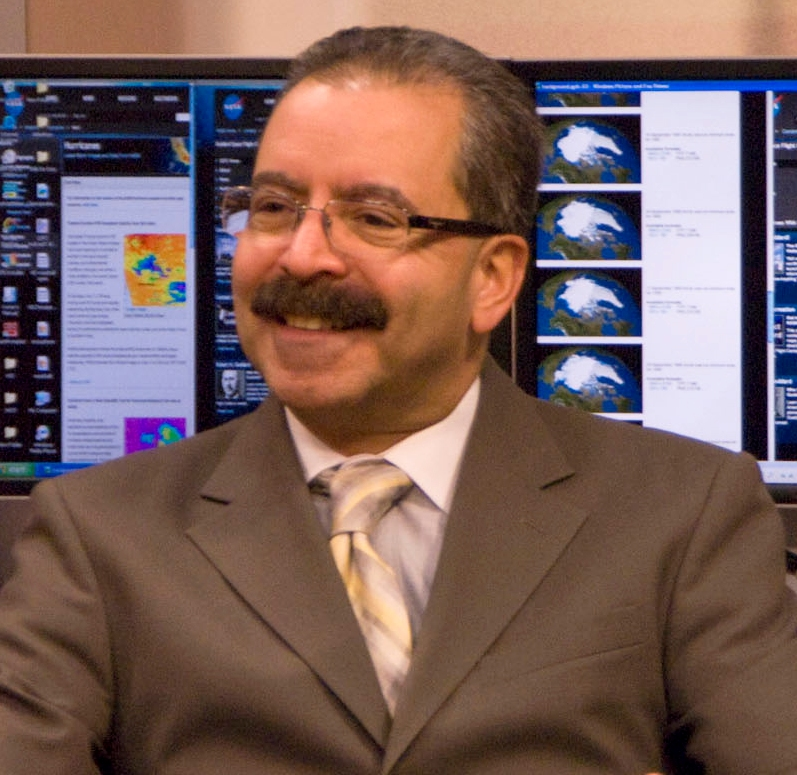
Orlando Figueroa (BS 1978), Director of the Mars Exploration Program in NASA

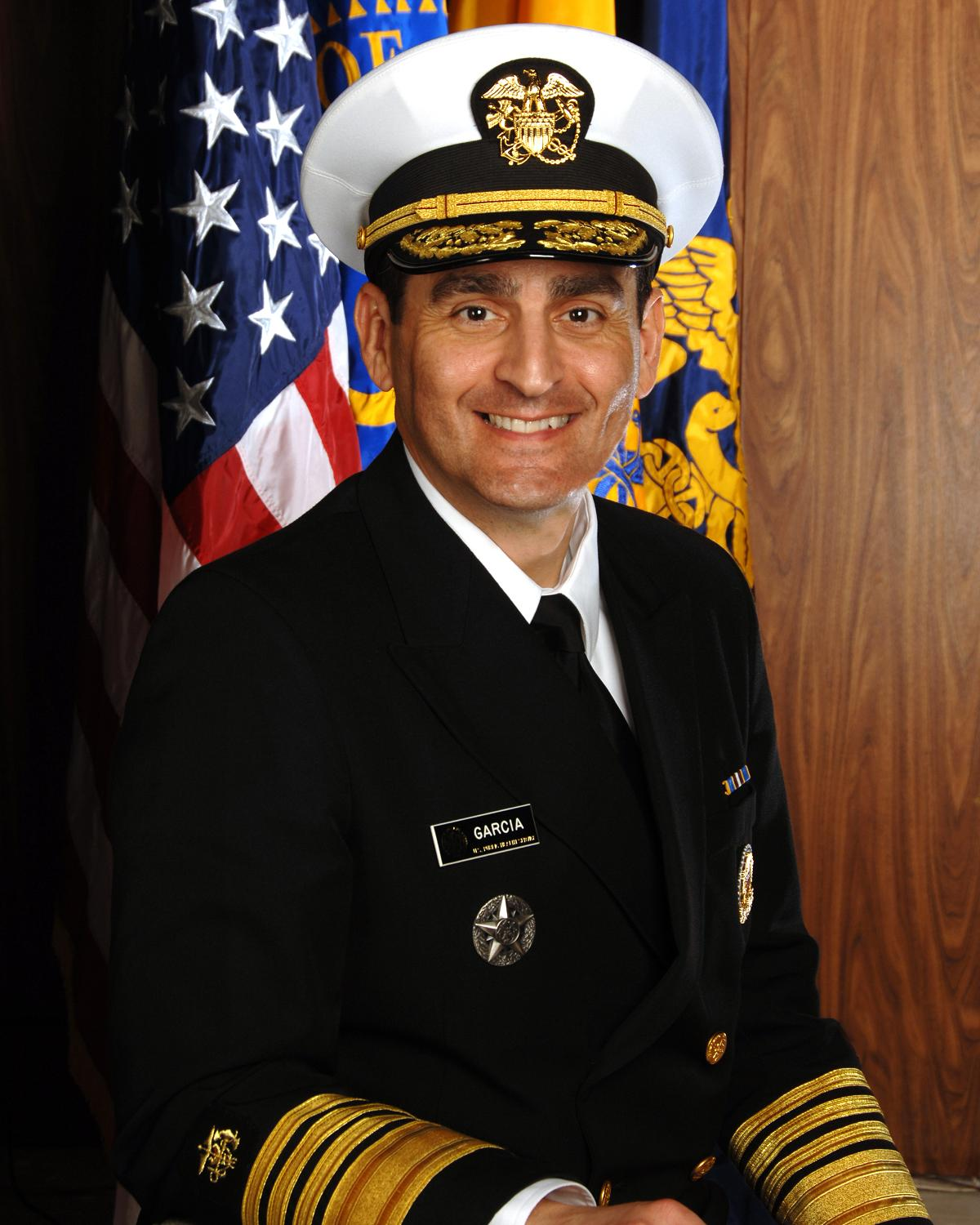
Joxel García (BS), former four-star admiral in the U.S. Public Health Service Commissioned Corps. He served as Assistant Secretary for Health and currently serves as the president of the Ponce School of Medicine

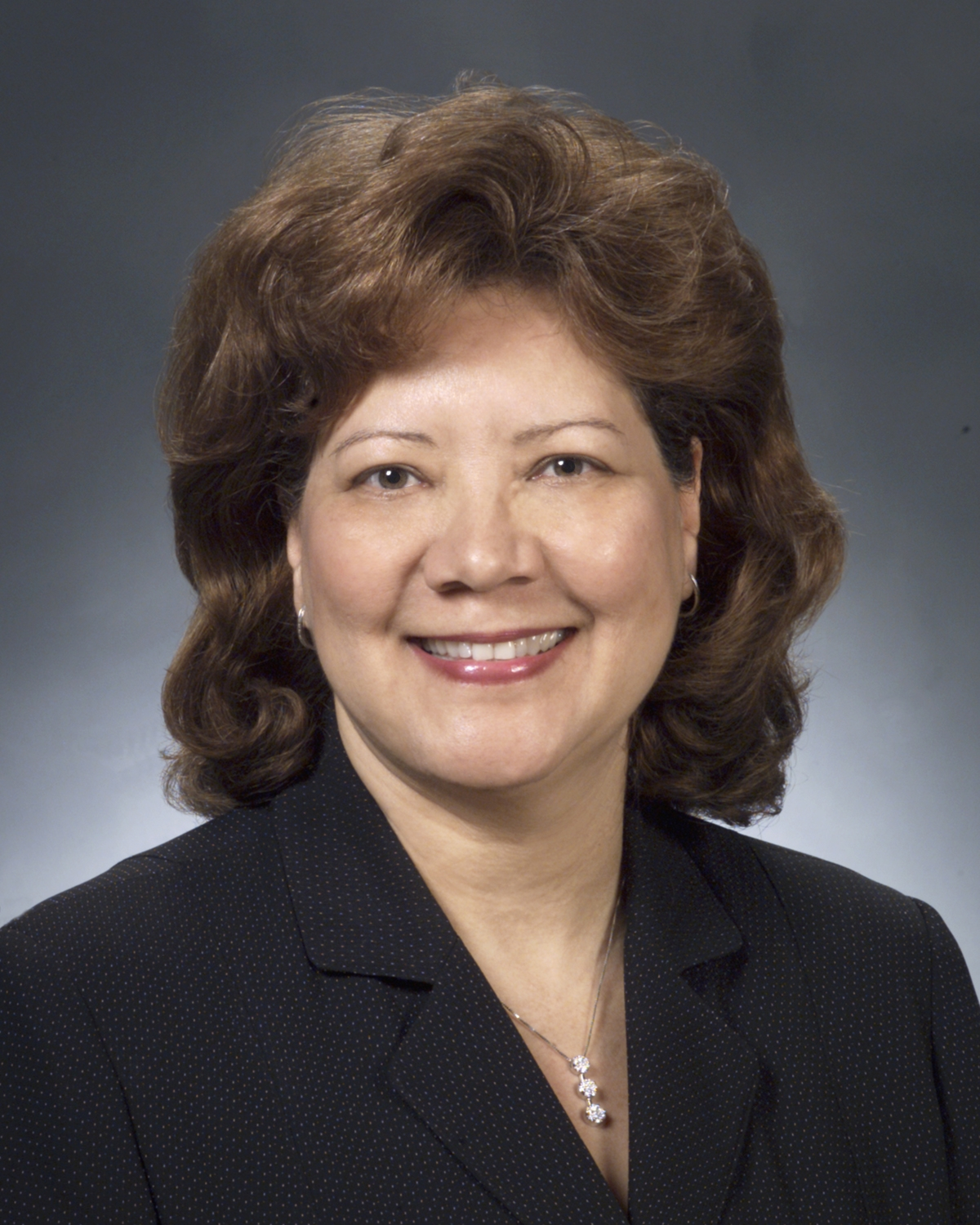
Olga D. González-Sanabria (BS), is the highest ranking Hispanic at NASA Glenn Research Center

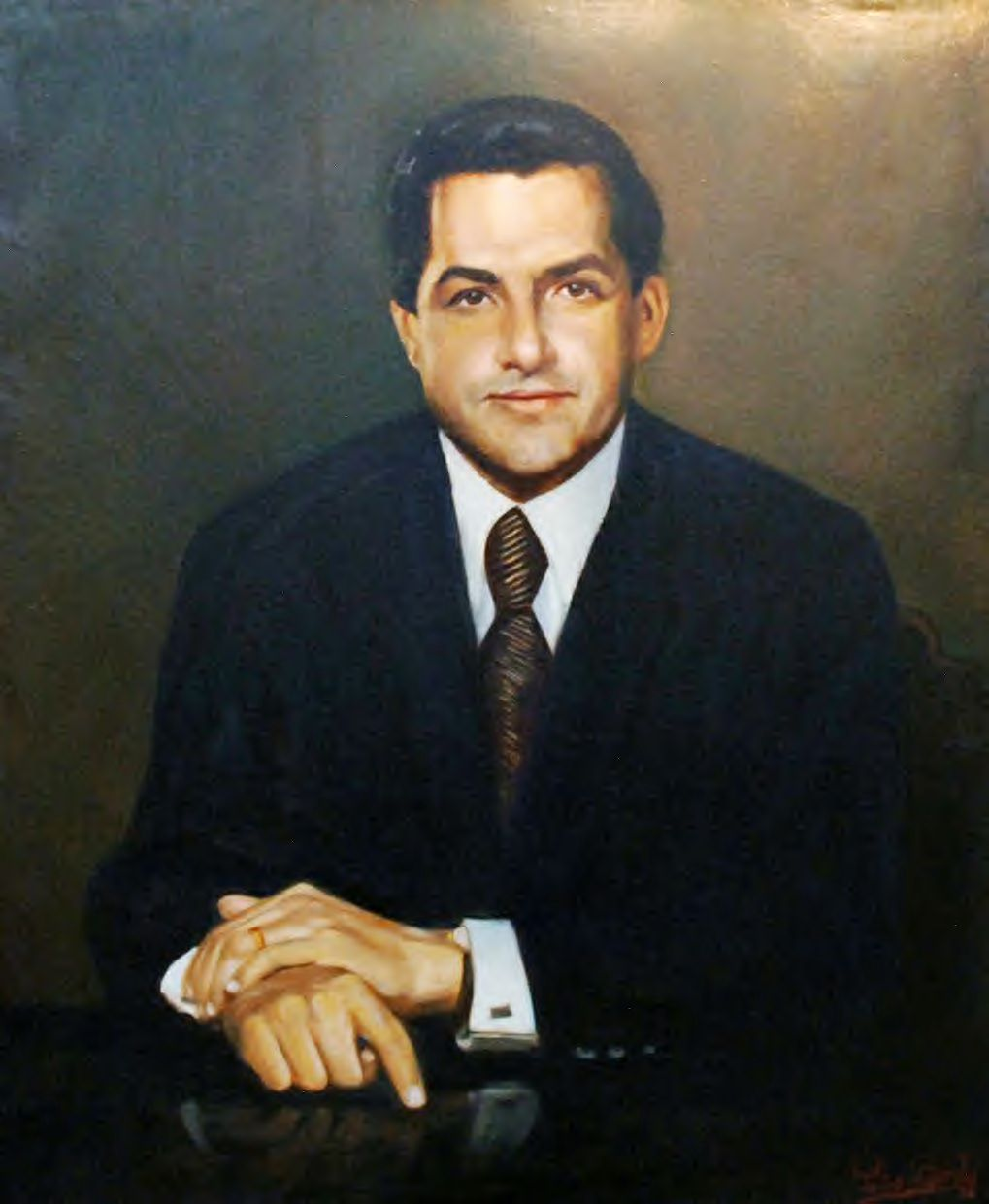
Rafael Hernández Colón (JD 1956), 4th governor of Puerto Rico first term (1973-1977), second term (1985-1993, State Senator, Puerto Rico Senate (1969-1973)

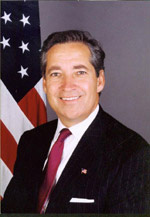
Hans Hertell (JD), U.S. Ambassador to the Dominican Republic, (2001-2007).

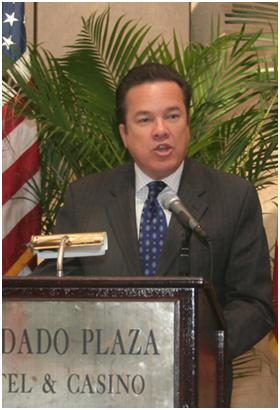
Kenneth McClintock (UHS, 1974, Undergraduate 1974–77), 22nd Secretary of State of Puerto Rico, (2009-2013), 13th President of the Senate of Puerto Rico, (2005-2008), State Senator, Senate of Puerto Rico, (1993-2008), San Juan City Councilman (1990–93)

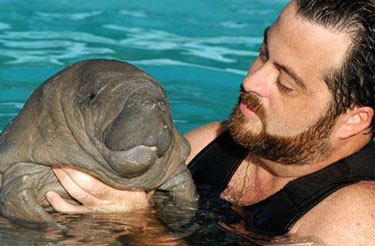
Antonio Mignucci (PhD 1996), a biological oceanographer specializing in the management and conservation of marine mammals

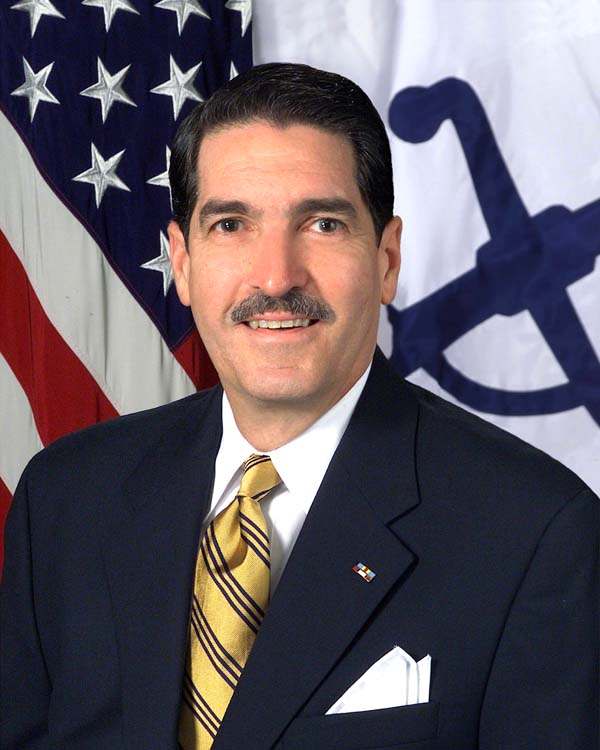
William A. Navas, Jr. (BS 1965), the first Puerto Rican to be named an Assistant Secretary of the Navy

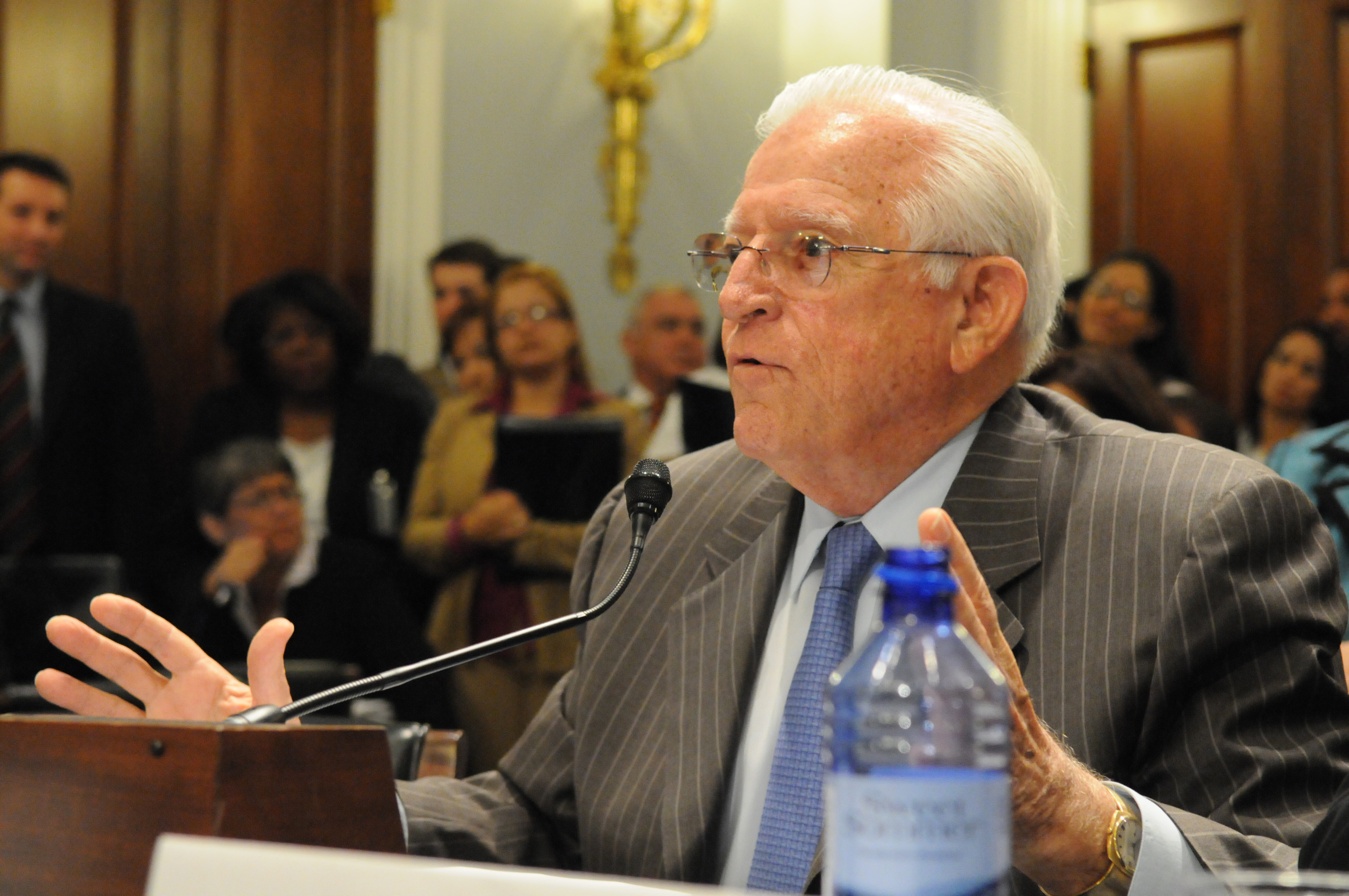
Carlos Romero Barceló (JD 1956), U.S. Representative (Resident commissioner), D-Puerto Rico (1993-2000), 5th Governor of Puerto Rico (1977–1985), State Senator, Puerto Rico Senate (1986-1988), Mayor of San Juan, Puerto Rico (1969-1977)

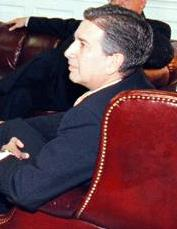
Pedro Rosselló (MPH 1981), 6th Governor of Puerto Rico (1993–2001), State Senator, Puerto Rico Senate (2005-2008)

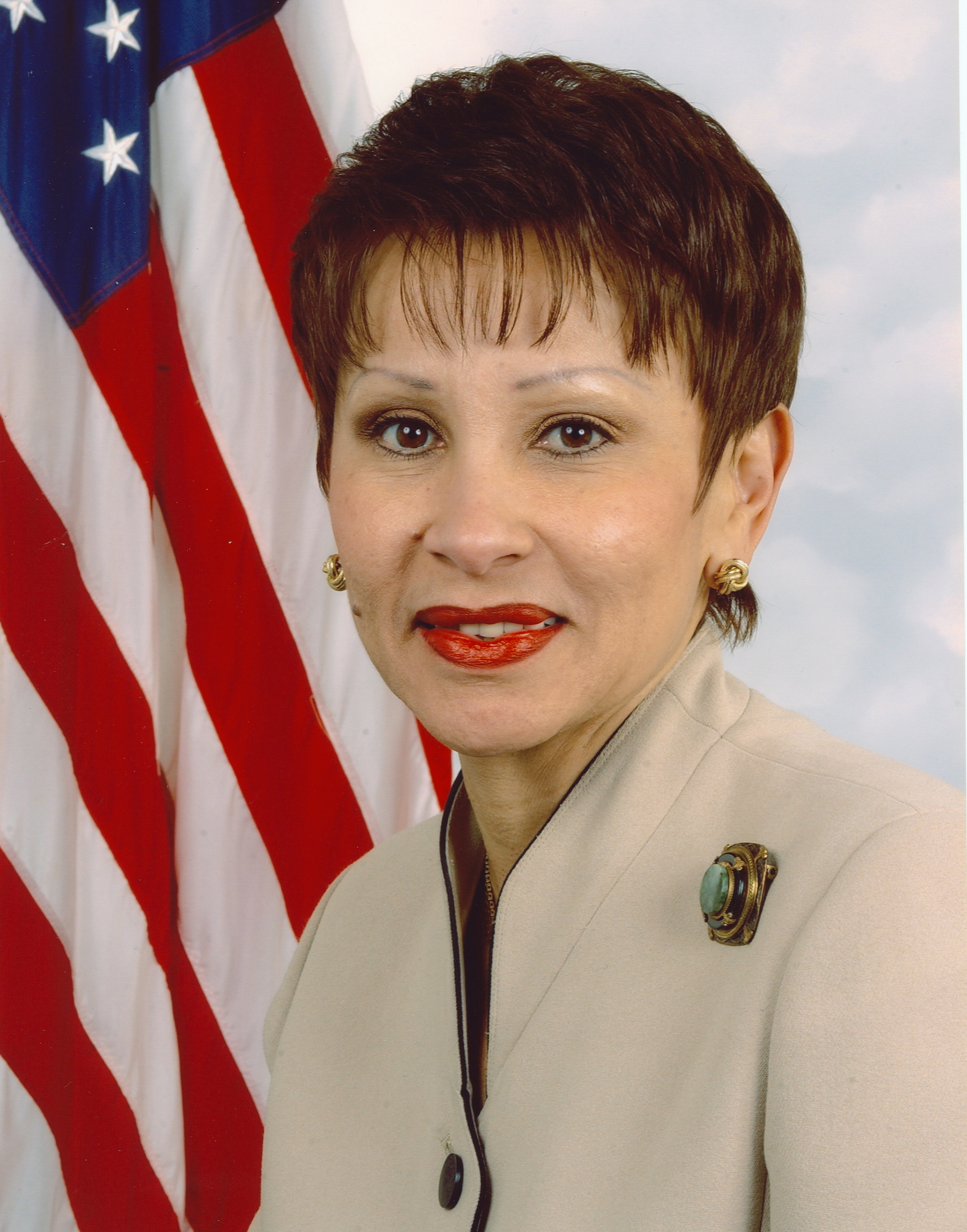
Nydia Velázquez (BA 1974), U.S. Representative, D-New York (1993–present)

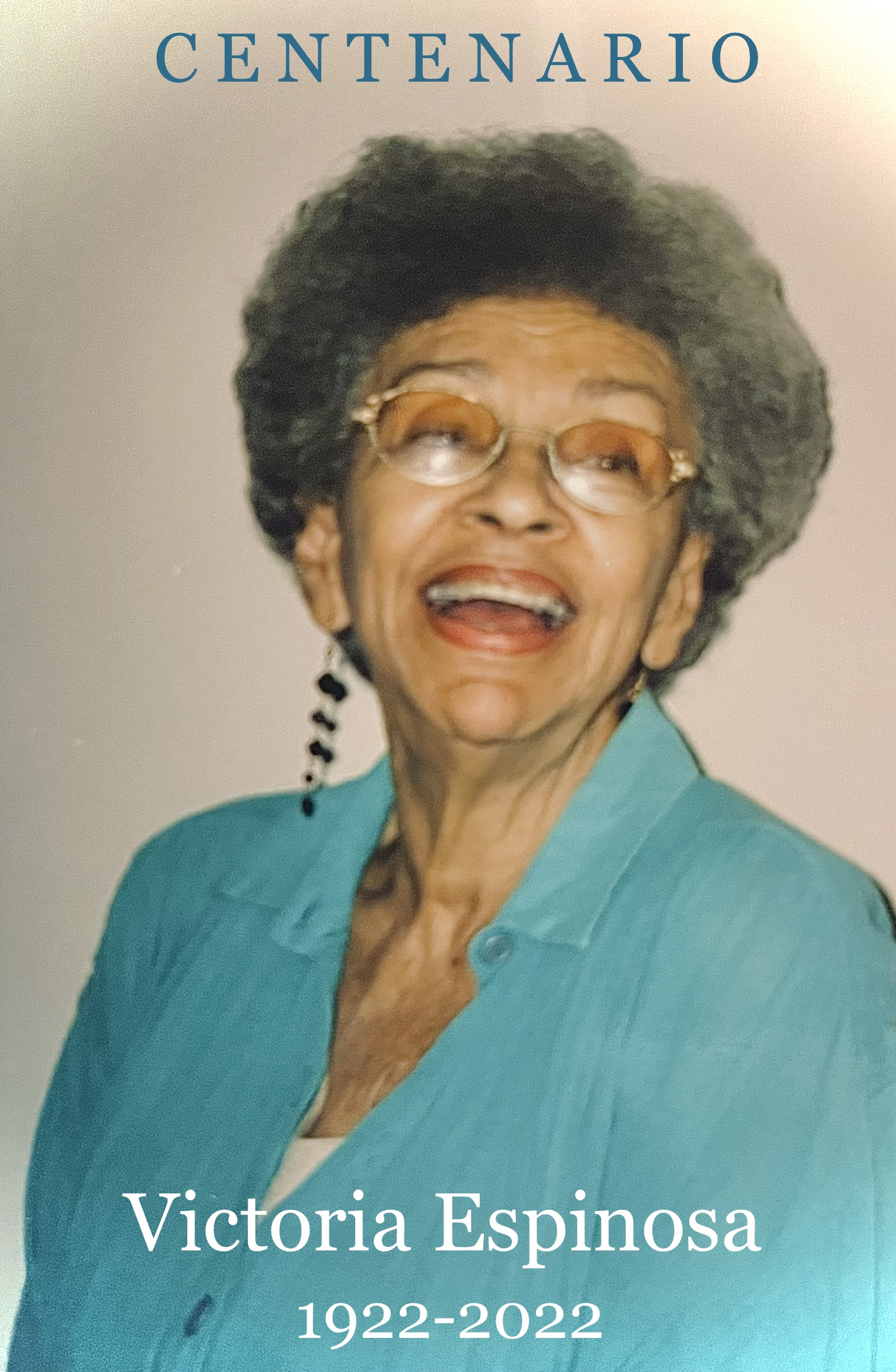
Former Professor of Theatre, who became known as "the 'grand dame' of Puerto Rican theatre"

== See also ==
- School of Tropical Medicine
- 2010 University of Puerto Rico Strike
