= Antonio García Padilla =

Puerto Rican educator

- Born: 1954 (age 71–72); Ponce, Puerto Rico
- Occupations: Writer, Lawyer and Educator

Antonio García Padilla (born 1954 in Ponce, Puerto Rico) is a Puerto Rican scholar. He served as the president of University of Puerto Rico from 2001 to 2009.

== Early life and education ==
Antonio Garcia Padilla was born in Ponce and raised in the nearby town of Coamo. He has five brothers, among them Alejandro, former senator and Governor of Puerto Rico, and Juan Carlos, current mayor of Coamo, Puerto Rico.

García Padilla received a bachelor's degree in Finance, Magna Cum Laude, and a Juris Doctor, Magna Cum Laude, from the University of Puerto Rico. Before studying law, he was part of the team of the Office of Monopolistic Affairs of the Department of Justice of Puerto Rico.

García Padilla went on to earn a LL.M. from Yale Law School in 1981. He has served as law clerk first to the Supreme Court of Puerto Rico and then on the United States Court of Appeals for the First Circuit, for Judge Stephen Breyer.

After his clerkship, he became an assistant professor at the University of Puerto Rico School of Law, later serving as associate dean of the law school in 1983 and dean in 1986. He served as dean of the law school until 2001 when he was elected president of the University of Puerto Rico. In 1999, he was elected to the Council of The American Law Institute.

== President ==
Antonio García Padilla served as president of the University of Puerto Rico. He assumed the presidency on 25 November 2001, and resigned on 30 September 2009.

== Later career ==
Professor García Padilla currently chairs the Puerto Rican Academy of Jurisprudence and Legislation, is a member of the Council of the Section of Legal Education and Admissions to the Profession of the American Bar Association, which is ultimately responsible for the accreditation of law schools in the United States. He is a member of the Committee on Emerging Markets and Innovations of the Law School Admission Council. He has been a member of the Council of the American Law Institute, a Commissioner of the Middle States Commission on Higher Education and has served on multiple committees, commissions and task forces in these and other entities in the fields of law and education. For seven years he chaired the Luis Muñoz Marín Foundation of Puerto Rico. He is a member of the Iberoamerican Forum.

Antonio García Padilla has been a member of the Board of Directors of Universal Insurance Co. the largest insurance company in Puerto Rico and has been an advisor to Universia, the association of Latin American, Spanish and Portuguese universities supported by Banco Santander. He is also a member of the panel of commercial arbitrators of the American Arbitration Association and is an arbitrator in the United States District Court for the District of Puerto Rico.

Professor García Padilla teaches courses on Commercial Contracts, Payment Systems, Secured Transactions and Commercial Arbitration. In addition, he is a member of the editorial board of the Revista Jurídica de Catalunya and has published extensively in commercial law and education.

== See also ==
- University of Puerto Rico

Academic offices
Preceded by Norman Maldonado	President of the University of Puerto Rico; 2001–2009	Succeeded by José Ramón de la Torre
Preceded by Efrén Rivera Ramos	Dean of the University of Puerto Rico School of Law; 1986–2001	Succeeded by Carlos G. Cadilla
