= José Ramón de la Torre =

Puerto Rican academic

President of the University of Puerto Rico
- In office 2010–2011
- Preceded by: Antonio García Padilla
- Succeeded by: Miguel A. Muñoz

Personal details
- Born: August 2, 1935 San Juan, Puerto Rico
- Died: September 30, 2022 (aged 87)
- Education: University of Puerto Rico (BA, MA); Complutense University of Madrid (Ph.D)

José Ramón de la Torre Martínez (August 2, 1935 – September 30, 2022) was a Puerto Rican academic who was the chairman of the board of directors of the Institute of Puerto Rican Culture (ICP) and the Luis A. Ferré Performing Arts Center. De la Torre served as the University of Puerto Rico's ninth president from February 1, 2010, until his resignation on February 11, 2011 following the 2010–2011 University of Puerto Rico strikes.

== Education ==
De la Torre received his baccalaureate and master's degrees from the Department of Hispanic Studies of University of Puerto Rico, Rio Piedras (UPRRP), and his Ph.D. in Philosophy and Letters from the Complutense University of Madrid, in Madrid, Spain. He collaborate with related institutions such as the Center for Advanced Studies of Puerto Rico and the Caribbean and the University at Buffalo.

== Career ==
He was a Professor of Hispanic Literature at UPRRP, where he also served as dean of the Faculty of Humanities.

He was also a founding member of the Puerto Rican Association of University Professors (APPU) in 1962 and co-founder of the program of translation of the UPR.

On January 27, 2010, he was elected by UPR's Board of Trustees to serve as the university's ninth president. De la Torre was sworn in on February 1, 2010.

On February 11, 2011, he presented his resignation to the presidency of the University of Puerto Rico.

== See also ==
- University of Puerto Rico
- 2010 University of Puerto Rico Strike

Academic offices
Preceded by Antonio García Padilla	President of the University of Puerto Rico; 2010–2011	Succeeded by Miguel A. Muñoz
