= Arturo Morales Carrión =

Puerto Rican politician and historian

President of the University of Puerto Rico
- In office 1973–1976
- Preceded by: Amador Cobas
- Succeeded by: Ismael Almodovar

Personal details
- Born: November 16, 1913 Havana, Cuba
- Died: June 16, 1989 (aged 75) San Juan, Puerto Rico
- Education: University of Puerto Rico (BA); University of Texas at Austin (MA); Columbia University (Ph.D)

Dr. Arturo Morales Carrión (November 16, 1913 – June 28, 1989) was a historian, educator, public servant and humanist as Gov. Rafael Hernández Colón eulogized him, "one of the principal figures" in the history of Puerto Rico, after having served under Gov. Luis Muñoz Marín as Under Secretary of State of Puerto Rico, under President John F. Kennedy as Deputy Assistant Secretary of State for Inter-American Affairs, as special assistant to the Secretary General of the Organization of American States and as President of the University of Puerto Rico (1973-1977).

== Early life ==
Born in on November 17, 1913 Havana, Cuba of Puerto Rican parents, he studied at the Vila Mayo High School, and graduated in 1931 from the University High School (UHS), the alma mater of many prominent Puerto Ricans, before obtaining a B. A. degree, majoring in History and Political Science from the University of Puerto Rico in 1935. He obtained an M.A. in Latin American Studies from the University of Texas at Austin in 1936 and, later in life, obtained his Ph.D. in History and Government from Columbia University in 1950. In 1948 he married Inés Arandes Rexach, with whom he had two sons, Arturo and Edgardo, and one daughter, Inés Morales Arandes.

== Public life ==
In 1953, Gov. Muñoz and Secretary of State Roberto Sánchez Vilella appointed Morales Carrión as Under Secretary of State, the position held for eleven of the past 22 years by José Rodríguez Suárez, and a post he held until 1961 for eight years. During that period, he spearheaded efforts to provide technical assistance to neighboring nations and promoting cultural exchanges.

In 1961, President Kennedy appointed Dr. Morales Carrión as Deputy Assistant Secretary of State for Inter-American Affairs until 1964, and helped organize the Alliance for Progress led by a fellow Puerto Rican, Teodoro Moscoso.

From 1964 to 1969, he served as Special Assistant to the Secretary General of the OAS.

Back in Puerto Rico, in 1973, he was chosen as President of UPR, a post he held until 1977. At UPR, he had earlier been chairman of its History Department, founded decades ago by Dr. Pilar Barbosa. At UPR, and as its president, he created the Center for Historic Research. He also founded the Puerto Rico Foundation of the Humanities and served as its Executive Director until his death in 1989.

Throughout his life, he served as visiting professor at innumerable institutions of higher learning, including Harvard University. Columbia University, George Washington University and the University of Miami, as well as other universities in the Caribbean and Latin America.

== Death ==
Arturo Morales Carrión died on June 28, 1989, in San Juan, Puerto Rico. He was buried at Santa María Magdalena de Pazzis Cemetery in San Juan, Puerto Rico.

== Honors and recognitions ==
Thirteen years after his death, the Interamerican University of Puerto Rico published a 1,000-plus page biography of Morales Carrión, edited by professor Héctor Luis Acevedo, that was presented at the Puerto Rico State Department on Nov. 14, 2012, with Acting Governor Kenneth McClintock offering remarks.

== Selected publications ==
Puerto Rico: A Political and Cultural History. New York: W.W. Norton & Company, Inc. 1983. (in English)

History of the People of Puerto Rico (in Spanish)

Albores Históricos del Capitalismo en Puerto Rico, 1972 (in Spanish)

== Sources ==
Centro Arturo Morales Carrión

Arturo Morales Carrión: Dimensiones del gran diplomático puertorriqueño, edited by Héctor Luis Acevedo, 2012, Interamerican University of Puerto Rico, ISBN 978-1-617900-76-1 (in Spanish)

Academic offices
Preceded by Amador Cobas	President of the University of Puerto Rico; 1973–1976	Succeeded by Ismael Almodovar
