= 2016 Metropolitan FA season =

Metropolitan FA
2016 season
- President: Eva R. González
- Head Coach: Jorge Silvetti
- Stadium: Reparto Metropolitano Stadium
- Highest home attendance: League:
- Lowest home attendance: League:
- Average home league attendance: League:

The 2016 Metropolitan FA season was the club's second season of existence. The club played in the Puerto Rico Soccer League, the first tier of the Puerto Rico soccer pyramid.

== Transfers ==
=== In ===
Date	Position	Nationality	Name	From	Fee	Ref.
		(Puerto Rico)				

=== Out ===
Date	Position	Nationality	Name	To	Fee	Ref.
	MF	(United States)				

=== Loans in ===
Date from	Position	Nationality	Name	From	Date to	Ref.
		(Puerto Rico)				

=== Loans out ===
Date from	Position	Nationality	Name	To	Date to	Ref.
		(Puerto Rico)				

=== Trial ===
Date From	Date To	Position	Nationality	Name	Last Club
			(Puerto Rico)		

== Competitions ==
Win Loss Draw

=== Pre-season ===
The 2016 Metropolitan FA schedule has not been announced.

=== Puerto Rico Soccer League ===
==== PRSL Apertura season ====
Pos	Team	Pld	W	D	L	GF	GA	GD	Pts
1	Academia Quintana	13	11	2	0	47	10	+37	35
2	Metropolitan FA	13	9	3	1	29	9	+20	30
3	Atlético Fajardo	13	7	5	1	39	19	+20	26
4	Bayamón FC	13	8	0	5	34	17	+17	24
5	Yabuco FC	13	6	5	2	30	16	+14	23

===== Matches =====
April 2, 2016 1 - H	Metropolitan FA	3 - 1	Bayamon FC	San Juan
PM				Stadium: Estadio Reparto Metropolitano; Attendance: --

April 17, 2016 2 - H	Metropolitan FA	2 - 2	Atlético Fajardo	San Juan
PM				Stadium: Estadio Reparto Metropolitano; Attendance: --

April 19, 2016 3 - H	Metropolitan FA	2 - 0	Fenix SC	San Juan
PM				Stadium: Estadio Reparto Metropolitano; Attendance: --

April 24, 2016 4 - A	Isabela SC	0 - 5	Metropolitan FA	Pista Paco Dumeng
PM				Attendance: --

May 1, 2016 5 - H	Metropolitan FA	2 - 0	Leal Arecibo	San Juan
PM				Stadium: Estadio Reparto Metropolitano; Attendance: --

May 7, 2016 6 - A	Caguas Sporting FC	0 - 1	Metropolitan FA	Caguas
PM				Stadium: Angel O. Berrios Sports Complex; Attendance: --

May 15, 2016 7 - A	Mayaguez FC	0 - 3	Metropolitan FA	Pista Atlética Aguada
PM				Attendance: --

May 21, 2016 8 - H	Metropolitan FA	2 - 1	Club Deportivo Barbosa	San Juan
PM				Stadium: Estadio Reparto Metropolitano; Attendance: --

May 25, 2016 9 - A	Yabuco FC	2 - 2	Metropolitan FA	Pista Atlética Adam Fonseca
PM				Attendance: --

May 29, 2016 10 - A	Don Bosco FC (Puerto Rico)	0 - 1	Metropolitan FA	Don Bosco
PM				Attendance: --

June 3, 2017 11 - A	Ballista FC	1 - 1	Metropolitan FA	Jose Salamán Star Sports Complex
PM				Attendance: --

June 15, 2016 12 - H	Metropolitan FA	2 - 3	Academia Quintana	San Juan
PM				Stadium: Estadio Reparto Metropolitano; Attendance: --

July 3, 2016 13 - H	Metropolitan FA	2 - 1	SPDP Spartans	San Juan
PM				Stadium: Estadio Reparto Metropolitano; Attendance: --

==== PRSL Clausura season ====
===== Standings =====
Pos	Team	Pld	W	D	L	GF	GA	GD	Pts
1	Bayamón FC	10	8	2	0	37	10	+27	26
2	Metropolitan FA	10	8	1	1	29	11	+18	25
3	Academia Quintana	10	6	1	3	33	20	+13	19
4	Atlético Fajardo	10	6	0	4	22	23	−1	18
5	Leal Arecibo FC	10	5	1	4	25	18	+7	16

Updated to match(es) played on unknown. Source:

===== Matches =====
August 7, 2016 1 - A	Club Deportivo Barbosa	0 - 1	Metropolitan FA	Complejo Deportivo José Celso Barbosa
4:00 PM			Khalil Martínez	Attendance: --

August 14, 2016 2 - H	Metropolitan FA	4 - 0	Yabuco FC	San Juan
4:00 PM	Christian Niño Delgado; Karlos Ferrer; Ian Camacho; Ian Camacho			Stadium: Estadio Reparto Metropolitano; Attendance: --

August 21, 2016 3 - A	Leal Arecibo FC	0 - 3	Metropolitan FA	Arecibo
4:00 PM			Christian Niño Delgado; Lucas Medina; Antonio Enright Nieves	Stadium: Polideportivo de Arecibo; Attendance: --

August 26, 2016 4 - A	Club Atlético Fajardo	1 - 6	Metropolitan FA	San Juan
8:30 PM	Adonis Andujar Cintrón		José A. Zúñiga; Lucas Medina; Lucas Medina; Khalil Martínez; Karlos Ferrer; Ian Camacho	Stadium: Estadio Reparto Metropolitano; Attendance: --

September 3, 2016 5 - H	Metropolitan FA	3 - 2	Ballista FC	San Juan
PM				Stadium: Estadio Reparto Metropolitano; Attendance: --

September 10, 2016 6 - A	Caguas Sporting FC	1 - 4	Metropolitan FA	Caguas
PM				Stadium: Complejo Deportivo Ángel O. Berríos; Attendance: --

September 15, 2016 7 - A	Bayamón FCB	3 - 0	Metropolitan FA	Bayamon
PM				Stadium: Bayamón Soccer Complex 1 Attendance: --

October 1, 2016 8 - A	Academia Quintana	1 - 1	Metropolitan FA	Don Bosco
PM				Attendance: --

October 9, 2016 9 - H	Metropolitan FA	5 - 2	Mayaguez FC	San Juan
PM				Stadium: Estadio Reparto Metropolitano; Attendance: --

October 23, 2016 10 - H	Metropolitan FA	2 - 1	Don Bosco FC	San Juan
PM				Stadium: Estadio Reparto Metropolitano; Attendance: --

==== PRSL Playoffs ====
Semifinals
1	Metropolitan FA
4	Atlético Fajardo
2	Academia Quintana
3	Bayamón FC

Finals
Metropolitan FA	0	2	3 Pen
Bayamón FC	0	2	1 Pen

=== Copa Luis Villarejo ===
The 2017 Copa Luis Villarejo schedule has not been announced.

== Goal scorers ==
Place	Position	Nation	Number	Name	PRSL Clausura Season	Total
TOTALS						
