= List of top Liga Puerto Rico Pro goal scorers by season =

All-Time Top Scorers in Liga Puerto Rico Pro (Pro League goals only)
Rank	Player	Goals
1	(Puerto Rico) **Jorge Rivera**	78
2	(Puerto Rico) **Kevin Hernández**	76
3	(Colombia) **Jhonathon Rivas**	50
(**Bold** denotes players still playing in the TT Pro League) (Italics denotes players still playing professional football)

The following is a list of the top goal scorers in the Liga Puerto Rico Pro, the top division of association football in Puerto Rico, since its inception in 2018. In each season, the top ten goal scorers are listed with their respective number of goals and club(s). Although incomplete statistics and goal scoring records exist for the 2021 through 2022–23 seasons, a list of the known top ten goal scorers is provided. If there are six or more players tied for tenth position in a season, then the players are excluded from the list.

Before Covid, Dennis Beltré, José I. González, and Adrián Oviedo became the first Pro League goal scorers to record ten or more goals in consecutive seasons between 2018 and 2019. Jeremy Roldan and Gerald Díaz became the first Pro League goal scorers to record ten or more goals in consecutive seasons a few years after when the league resumed play. Soon after, Héctor Ramos did it in consecutive seasons between 2023 and 2024. One year later, Jhonathon Rivas joined the list to become the second Pro League goal scorer to record ten or more goals in consecutive seasons during 2024 and 2025. The year after that, both Kevin Hernández and Jorge Rivera would join the duo in seasons 2025 and 2026.

== Top scorers by season ==
Key: (M) - missing, (A) season active.

2018-19 season
Rank	Player	Club	Goals
1	(Spain) Josep Becerra	Bayamón FC	32
2	(Puerto Rico) Dennis Beltré	Don Bosco FC	22
3	(Puerto Rico) José I. González	Guayama FC	20
4	(Puerto Rico) Alejandro Rabell	Bayamón FC	19
5	(Argentina) Adrián Oviedo	Metropolitan FA	16
6	(Puerto Rico) Karlos Ferrer	Metropolitan FA	13
6	(Puerto Rico) Miguel Rivera	Caguas Sporting FC	13
8	(Puerto Rico) Jorge Rivera	Don Bosco FC	12
9	(Puerto Rico) Hector Ramos	Don Bosco FC	11
10	(Puerto Rico) Emmanuel Torres	Guayama FC	10

2019-20 season
Rank	Player	Club	Goals
1	(Puerto Rico) José I. González	FC Mayagüez	18
2	(Argentina) Adrián Oviedo	Metropolitan FA	17
3	(Puerto Rico) Dennis Beltré	Don Bosco FC	15
4	(Puerto Rico) Alejandro Lopez	Leal Arecibo FC	13
4	(Puerto Rico) Jose Lopez	Bayamón FC	13
6	(Puerto Rico) Jan Mateo	GPS Puerto Rico	12
6	(Puerto Rico) Esdras Mendez	GPS Puerto Rico	12
8	4 Others		10

2020-21 season
Rank	Player	Club	Goals
No Season Due To COVID.

2021 season (M)
Rank	Player	Club	Goals

2022 season (M)
Rank	Player	Club	Goals

2022-23 season (M)
Rank	Player	Club	Goals

2023-24 Apertura season
Rank	Player	Club	Goals
1	(Puerto Rico) Marc Nieves	Academia Quintana	8
2	(Puerto Rico) Jeremy Roldan	Puerto Rico Sol FC	7
2	(Puerto Rico) Joseph Acevedo	Caguas Sporting FC	7
4	(Puerto Rico) Jan Mateo	Bayamon FC	6
4	(Puerto Rico) Luis Figueroa	Metropolitan FA	6
4	(Puerto Rico) Gerald Díaz	Academia Quintana	6
4	(Puerto Rico) Héctor Ramos	Metropolitan FA	6
7	(Puerto Rico) Jorge Rivera	Don Bosco FC	5
9	(Puerto Rico) Kevin Pagan	Academia Quintana	4
9	(Puerto Rico) Emmanuel Torres	Guayama FC	4

2023-24 Clausura season
Rank	Player	Club	Goals
1	(Puerto Rico) Kevin Hernández	Academia Quintana	10
2	(Puerto Rico) Ian Rodriguez	Caguas Sporting	9
3	(Puerto Rico) Jeremy Roldan	Puerto Rico Sol FC	6
4	(Puerto Rico) Hector Ramos	Metropolitan FA	5
4	(Puerto Rico) Gerald Díaz	Academia Quintana	5
4	(Puerto Rico) Adriel Gonzalez	Puerto Rico Surf SC	5
7	(Puerto Rico) Andres Suarez	Bayamon FC	4
7	(Puerto Rico) Jan Mateo	Bayamon FC	4
7	(Puerto Rico) Karlos Ferrer	Metropolitan FA	4
7	(Puerto Rico) Philip Hernandez	Puerto Rico Sol FC	4

2024-25 Apertura season
Rank	Player	Club	Goals
1	(Puerto Rico) Kevin Hernandez	Academia Quintana	12
2	(Puerto Rico) Gerald Díaz	Academia Quintana	11
3	(Argentina) Diego Amarilla	Metropolitan FA	9
3	(Puerto Rico) Christian Vargas	Caguas Sporting FC	9
3	(Colombia) Jhonathan Rivas	FC Mayagüez	9
3	(Puerto Rico) Luis Figueroa	Metropolitan FA	9
7	(Puerto Rico) Marc Nieves	Academia Quintana	8
8	(Puerto Rico) Lisandro Nunez	Caguas Sporting FC	7
8	(Ecuador) Daniel Montero	San Juan FC	7
10	(Puerto Rico) Ian Rodriguez	Caguas Sporting FC	6

2024-25 Clausura season
Rank	Player	Club	Goals
1	(Puerto Rico) Kevin Hernandez	Academia Quintana	23
2	(Colombia) Jhonathon Rivas	FC Mayagüez	17
3	(Argentina) Gabriel Mendez	Metropolitan FA	16
4	(Argentina) Bruno Romagnoli	Metropolitan FA	12
4	(Puerto Rico) Javier Hopgood	San Juan FC	12
4	(Puerto Rico) Jorge Rivera	Metropolitan FA	12
7	(Puerto Rico) Diego Santiago	DS Edusoccer	10
9	(Argentina) Jano Barrios	Metropolitan FA	9
9	(Puerto Rico) Jorge Rodriguez	Puerto Rico Surf SC	9
10	(Puerto Rico) Guiwyn Alsina	EF Taurinos de Cayey	8

2025-26 Apertura season
Rank	Player	Club	Goals
1	(Puerto Rico) Jorge Rivera	Metropolitan FA	29
2	(Puerto Rico) Kevin Hernández	Puerto Rico Surf FC	19
3	(Puerto Rico) Kevin Torres	Academia Quintana	17
4	(Colombia) Jhonathan Rivas	Ponce FC	14
5	(Puerto Rico) Christian Vargas	Caguas Sporting FC	13
6	(Puerto Rico) Wilfredo Rivera	Academia Quintana	10
7	(Puerto Rico) Dante Williams	Ponce FC	8
7	(Puerto Rico) Héctor Ramos	Metropolitan FA	8
9	(Puerto Rico) Marc Nieves	Academia Quintana	7
9	(Puerto Rico) Joseph Villafane	Caguas Sporting FC	7

2025-26 Clausura season
Rank	Player	Club	Goals
1	(Puerto Rico) Kevin Torres	Academia Quintana	27
2	(Puerto Rico) Jorge Rivera	Metropolitan FA	20
3	(Argentina) Christian Aragon	EF Taurinos de Cayey	16
4	(Puerto Rico) Dante Williams	Ponce FC	15
5	(Puerto Rico) Joel Burgos	Metropolitan FA	13
6	(Puerto Rico) Kevin Hernandez	Puerto Rico Surf FC	12
7	(Puerto Rico) Christian Vargas	Caguas Sporting FC	11
7	(Puerto Rico) Philip Hernández	Ponce FC	11
9	(Colombia) Jhonathon Rivas	Ponce FC	10
9	(Puerto Rico) Lorenzo Baez	Puerto Rico Surf FC	10

2026-27 Apertura season (A)
Rank	Player	Club	Goals

== Appearances in top scorers by season ==
Note: 3 seasons are missing info, and 1 season is currently active.

=== Multiple appearances ===
Rank	Player	Total	Seasons
1	(Puerto Rico) Jorge Rivera	5	2018–19, 2023–24 Apertura, 2024–25 Clausura, 2025–26 Apertura, 2025–26 Clausura
2	(Puerto Rico) Kevin Hernández	4	2023–24 Clausura, 2024–25 Clausura, 2025–26 Apertura, 2025–26 Clausura
2	(Puerto Rico) Héctor Ramos	4	2018–19, 2023–24 Apertura, 2023–24 Clausura, 2025–26 Apertura
2	(Colombia) Jhonathon Rivas	4	2024-25 Apertura, 2024-25 Clausura, 2025-26 Apertura, 2025-26 Clausura

=== Appearances by club ===
Rank	Club	Total
1	Metropolitan FA	17
2	Academia Quintana	13
3	Caguas Sporting FC	9
4	Bayamon FC	6
5	Don Bosco FC	5
5	Ponce FC	5
5	Puerto Rico Surf SC	5
8	Guayama FC	3
8	FC Mayagüez	3
8	Puerto Rico Sol FC	3
11	EF Taurinos de Cayey	2
11	GPS Puerto Rico	2
11	San Juan FC	2
14	DS Edusoccer	1
14	Leal Arecibo FC	1
Total		77

=== Appearances by nationality ===
Rank	Country	Total
1	Puerto Rico	64
2	Argentina	7
3	Colombia	4
4	Ecuador	1
4	Spain	1
Total		77
