= Puerto Rican football league system =

Professional and amateur soccer leagues based in Puerto Rico

The Puerto Rico soccer league system is a series of soccer leagues based in Puerto Rico. Sometimes erroneously called the Puerto Rican soccer pyramid, teams and leagues in the United States are not linked by the system of promotion and relegation typical in soccer elsewhere. Instead, the Puerto Rican Football Federation (FPF) officially defines leagues in levels, called divisions. Only the top division is officially sanctioned by the FPF with second division leagues sanctioned by local regional organizations.

== Organization ==
The Puerto Rican Football Federation (FPF) is the national governing body of Puerto Rican football. Below the national level, the island is divided into six regional organizations. These regional associations often only organize youth leagues, however, Organización Regional del Norte organizes a senior league, Liga del Norte de Futbol de Puerto Rico. These regional leagues effectively act as the second tier of Puerto Rican football.

=== Regional Organizations ===
- Organización Regional Central
- Organización Regional del Norte
- Organización Regional del Sur
- Organización Regional del Este
- Organización Regional del Oeste
- Organización Región Metro

== Men ==
Pro Soccer Teams (includes teams outside PR)
Year	Teams	PRSL (D1)	
2008	8	8	
Year	Teams	PRSL (D1)	LNF (D2)
2009	25	9	16
2010	29	8^{1}	21
2011	23	6	17
Year	Teams	LNF (D1)	
2012	-	-^{2}	
Year	Teams	PRSL (D1)	LNF (D1)
2013	-	-	9
2014	-	-	12
2015	17	11^{3}	6
2016	11	11	-^{4}
2017	-	-	-
Year	Teams	LPR Pro (D1)	
2018-19	8	8	
2019-20	13	13	
2020-21		COVID	
2021	7	7	
2022	8	8	
2022–23	5/5	5/5	
2023–24	8/8	8/8	
2024–25	10/10	10/10	
2025–26	10/11	10/11	
2026–27	9	9	

In Puerto Rico, men's outdoor soccer leagues are sanctioned by the Puerto Rican Football Federation. FPF doesn't currently recognise any league as fully professional, but Liga Puerto Rico is recognised as division 1 status. Liga Puerto Rico teams range widely in financial status with some able to pay semi-pro wages and others made up entirely of amateurs. There are no leagues under Liga Puerto Rico that are recognised by the FPF however some regional associations recognise senior leagues.

=== Professional ===
There are currently no fully professional leagues recognized.

==== Notes ====
_{^{1}The PRSL recessed on 2010, and established a new tournament called "Supercopa DirecTV 2010" which served as the qualifier for the 2011 CFU Club Championship.}

_{^{2}The PRSL folded in the 2012 season, leaving Liga Nacional to be the sole D1 league at the time.}

_{^{3} The 2015 Puerto Rico Soccer League season did not take place, but teams then participated in the Excellence Cup}

_{^{4} The 2016 Liga Nacional season did not take place, but teams then participated in the Copa Luis Villarejo}

=== Pro-am ===
Founded in 2018, Liga Puerto Rico is the FPF sanctioned first division football league in Puerto Rico. Clubs range from semi-professional to Amateur. The winner of the league earns a berth in the following CFU Club Championship. The league has 9 clubs as of the 2026 Apertura.

Division	Effective Football League System of Puerto Rico
I	Liga Puerto Rico Pro; 9 clubs – No relegation
II	No league at this level
III	Regional Leagues; 66 clubs – No promotion/relegation

=== Amateur ===
==== Regional Leagues ====
League	Level	Teams	Founded	Organizer
Liga del Central de Futbol de Puerto Rico	2 (Effective)	8	2023	Organización Regional del Central
Liga del Norte de Futbol de Puerto Rico	2 (Effective)	7	2023	Organización Regional del Norte
Liga del Sur de Futbol de Puerto Rico	2 (Effective)	14	2023	Organización Regional del Sur
Liga del Este de Futbol de Puerto Rico	2 (Effective)	7	2023	Organización Regional del Este
Liga del Oeste de Futbol de Puerto Rico	2 (Effective)	9	2023	Organización Regional del Oeste
Liga del Metro de Futbol de Puerto Rico	2 (Effective)	21	2023	Organización Regional del Metro

Liga del Norte de Futbol de Puerto Rico is regional league run by Organización Regional del Norte, A regional affiliate of the FPF. The league has 10 teams as of the 2023 season. The league is fully amateur. As of 2025, the league has grown to 3 divisions.

=== Youth ===
League	U21 Teams	U17 Teams	15 Teams
Liga Elite de Puerto Rico	10	12	13
Liga Junior Puerto Rico	-	12	12
Liga Youth Soccer Tournament	-	-	-

Puerto Rico has historically struggled to organize a national youth football competition. FPF formally recognises Liga Junior Puerto Rico as its national youth competition however Liga Elite de Puerto Rico arguably serves the nation as effectively as LJPR.

=== Men's national soccer cups ===
- Copa Luis Villarejo — open to all FPF-sanctioned amateur and professional leagues
- Copa Quintana - An invitational tournament hosted by San Juan based club Academia Quintana. The tournament includes brackets for multiple age groups as well as senior sides for both men and women.

=== Defunct Leagues ===
- Puerto Rico Soccer League (2008-2017)
- Liga Nacional de Fútbol de Puerto Rico (2009-2016)
