= 2017 Bayamon Cup =

Tournament for clubs in Puerto Rico organized by Bayamón FC

2017 Bayamon City Cup
Tournament details
- Country: Puerto Rico
- Teams: 10

Final positions
- Champions: Puerto Rico FC
- Runners-up: Bayamon FC

Tournament statistics
- Matches played: 23

The 2017 Bayamon Cup is the seventh edition of the Bayamon City Cup, a cup tournament for clubs in Puerto Rico organized by Bayamón FC.

== Teams ==
The tournament was open to all league clubs from Puerto Rico, most clubs used this competition as preseason for the start of 2017 season.

=== North American Soccer League (1 team) ===
- Puerto Rico FC

=== Liga Atlética Interuniversitaria (LAI)(2 teams) ===
- UPR Mayaguez - Colegio
- Universidad del Turabo

=== Puerto Rico Soccer League (7 teams) ===
- Bayamon FC
- CD Barbosa
- Fraigcomar FC
- Guayama FC
- GPS Puerto Rico
- Leal Arecibo FC
- Metropolitan FA

== Schedule ==
| First round | Group A | 10 – 3 February - March 2017 |
| First round | Groups B | 10 – 3 February - March 2017 |
| Semi-Final round | 8 March 2017 | |
| Final round | 11 March 2017 | |

== First round ==
In the first round, the 10 teams were divided into 2 groups of five teams. Each group is played on a round-robin basis, hosted at the Bayamon Soccer Complex. The top two teams from each group will progress to the semifinal round. The two winners will face each other in the final on March 11.

=== Group A ===
| Pos | Team | Pld | W | D | L | GF | GA | GD | Pts | Qualification |
|---|---|---|---|---|---|---|---|---|---|---|
| 1 | Bayamon FC | 3 | 2 | 1 | 0 | 7 | 3 | +4 | 7 | Semi-Finals |
| 2 | GPS Puerto Rico | 4 | 2 | 1 | 1 | 11 | 8 | +3 | 7 | |
| 3 | Universidad del Turabo | 3 | 1 | 2 | 0 | 7 | 5 | +2 | 5 | |
| 4 | Guayama FC | 3 | 1 | 0 | 2 | 7 | 7 | 0 | 3 | |
| 5 | Colegio | 3 | 0 | 0 | 3 | 0 | 9 | −9 | 0 | |

=== Matches ===
February 10, 2017
9:00 PM

| Bayamon FC | 2 - 0 | Colegio |
|---|---|---|
| Jorge Rosa (Pen); Josep Becerra |

Bayamón Soccer Complex
February 10, 2017
9:00 PM

| Guayama FC | 2 - 3 | GPS Puerto Rico |
|---|---|---|
| Joseph Rivera; Carlos Garay | | Jose "Picu" Rodríguez; Joffren Santos; Anthony "Toño" Martínez |

Bayamón Soccer Complex 3
February 15, 2017
9:00 PM

| Guayama FC | 2 - 4 | Universidad del Turabo |

Bayamón Soccer Complex 2
February 15, 2017
9:00 PM

| GPS Puerto Rico | 2 - 4 | Bayamon FC |
|---|---|---|
| Felipe Barrera; Mark Nieves | | Josep Becerra |

Bayamón Soccer Complex
February 19, 2017
5:00 PM

| GPS Puerto Rico | 4 - 0 | Colegio |

Bayamón Soccer Complex
February 19, 2017
7:00 PM

| Bayamon FC | 1 - 1 | Universidad del Turabo |

Bayamón Soccer Complex
February 24, 2017
7:00 PM

| Universidad del Turabo | 2 - 2 | GPS Puerto Rico |
|---|---|---|
| James López; José Iván González | | Anthony Martinez; Anthony Martinez |

Bayamón Soccer Complex 2
February 24, 2017
9:00 PM

| Colegio | 0 - 3 | Guayama FC |
|---|---|---|
| | | Carlos “Chacho” Grueso; Christian García; Ray Torres. |

Bayamón Soccer Complex 3
March 3, 2017
7:00 PM

| Guayama FC | 1 - 9 | Bayamon FC |

Bayamón Soccer Complex 2
March 3, 2017
9:00 PM

| Universidad del Turabo | 2 - 1 | UPR Cayey |

Bayamón Soccer Complex 3

=== Group B ===
| Pos | Team | Pld | W | D | L | GF | GA | GD | Pts | Qualification |
|---|---|---|---|---|---|---|---|---|---|---|
| 1 | Puerto Rico FC | 4 | 4 | 0 | 0 | 23 | 0 | +23 | 12 | Semi-Finals |
| 2 | Club de Fútbol Fraigcomar | 2 | 1 | 0 | 1 | 2 | 1 | +1 | 3 | |
| 3 | Metropolitan FA | 3 | 1 | 0 | 2 | 3 | 6 | −3 | 3 | |
| 4 | Club Deportivo Barbosa | 3 | 1 | 0 | 2 | 2 | 7 | −5 | 3 | |
| 5 | Leal Arecibo FC (LEAL) | 3 | 1 | 0 | 2 | 3 | 11 | −8 | 0 (Note: 3 points deducted?) | |

=== Matches ===
February 10, 2017
9:00 PM

| Puerto Rico FC | 7 - 0 | Leal Arecibo FC |
|---|---|---|
| Hector "Pito" Ramos; Connor Doyle; Giuseppe Gentile; Giuseppe Gentile; Sydney Rivera; Brian Bement |

Bayamón Soccer Complex 2
February 16, 2017
7:00 PM

| CD Barbosa | 1 - 0 | Fraigcomar FC |
|---|---|---|
| John Henriquez |

Bayamón Soccer Complex
February 16, 2017
9:00 PM

| Leal Arecibo FC | 0 - 3 | Metropolitan FA |
|---|---|---|
| | | Olvin Ortiz Rodriguez; Olvin Ortiz Rodriguez; Diego Lucchesi |

Bayamón Soccer Complex 2
February 19, 2017
5:00 PM

| CD Barbosa | 1 - 3 | Leal Arecibo FC |
|---|---|---|
| Christian Hiraldo | | Alejandro López Jiménez; Alejandro López Jiménez; Alejandro López Jiménez |

Bayamón Soccer Complex 2
February 19, 2017
7:00 PM

| Puerto Rico FC | 4 - 0 | Metropolitan FA |
|---|---|---|
| Giuseppe Gentile; Pito Ramos; Sidney Rivera (Pen); Brian Bement |

Bayamón Soccer Complex 2
February 21, 2017
9:00 PM

| Metropolitan FA | 0 - 2 | Fraigcomar FC |

Bayamón Soccer Complex
February 24, 2017
9:00 PM

| CD Barbosa | 0 - 4 | Puerto Rico FC |
|---|---|---|
| | | Kyle Culbertson; Joseph "Jackie" Marrero; Guyanese - Emery Walshman; Hector "Pito" Ramos |

Bayamón Soccer Complex
February 24, 2017
9:00 PM

| Fraigcomar FC | 2 - 5 | Leal Arecibo FC |

Bayamón Soccer Complex
March 3, 2017
7:00 PM

| Metropolitan FA | 1 - 1 | CD Barbosa |

Bayamón Soccer Complex
March 3, 2017
9:00 PM

| Fraigcomar FC | 0 - 8 | Puerto Rico FC |
|---|---|---|
| | | Jordi Quintilla; Conor Doyle; Hector Ramos; Jackie MArrero; Brian Bement; Michael Kafari |

Bayamón Soccer Complex

Note: Some games were played out of order due to conflicts with the scheduling.

== Semi-final round ==
=== Matches ===
March 8, 2017
9:00 PM

| Puerto Rico FC | 9 - 0 | Universidad del Turabo |
|---|---|---|
| Hector Pito Ramos; Sidney Rivera; Brian Bement; Giuseppe Gentile |

Bayamón Soccer Complex 2
March 8, 2017
9:00 PM

| v | Bayamon FC |

Bayamón Soccer Complex

== Final round ==
The format of the final round have not been announced.

Qualified teams

- Bayamon FC
- Puerto Rico FC

Host venue: Bayamon Soccer Complex, Bayamon, Puerto Rico (all times UTC−4)

=== Matches ===
March 11, 2017
9:00 PM

| Bayamon FC | 1 - 1 | Puerto Rico FC |
|---|---|---|
| Josep Becerra | | Sidney Rivera 15' |
Penalties
| ? (penalty scored); 10 (penalty missed) ? (penalty scored); 22 (penalty scored) ? (penalty scored); 2? (penalty missed) ? (penalty scored); 8 (penalty scored); 7 (penalty scored); 4 (penalty missed); GK (penalty scored) ? (penalty missed); 10 (penalty scored) ? (penalty scored); 22 (penalty scored) ? (penalty missed) | 11–12 | (penalty scored) 9 Héctor Ramos; (penalty scored) 8 Conor Doyle; (penalty scored) 11 Giuseppe Gentile; (penalty scored) 29 Tyler Rudy; (penalty missed) 3 Kyle Culbertson; (penalty missed) 10 Joseph Marrero; (penalty scored) 21 Michael Kafari; (penalty scored) 15; (penalty scored) Mike Ramos; (penalty missed) 4 Rudy Dawson; (penalty scored) 1 Austin Pack; (penalty missed) 9 Héctor Ramos; (penalty scored) 8 Conor Doyle; (penalty scored) 11 Giuseppe Gentile; (penalty scored) 29 Tyler Rudy; (penalty scored) 3 Kyle Culbertson |

Bayamón Soccer Complex

== Top scorers ==
| Rank | Player | Team | Goals |
|---|---|---|---|
| 1 | (Puerto Rico) Héctor Ramos | Puerto Rico FC | 7 |
| 2 | (United States) Brian Bement | Puerto Rico FC | 6 |
| 3 | (United States) Sidney Rivera | Puerto Rico FC | 5 |
| 4 | (Puerto Rico) Giuseppe Gentile | Puerto Rico FC | 4 |
| 5 | (Puerto Rico) José “Picu” Rodríguez | GPS Puerto Rico | 3 |
| 6 | (Puerto Rico) Alejandro López Jiménez | (Puerto Rico) Leal Arecibo | 3 |
| 7 | (Puerto Rico) Mark Nieves | GPS Puerto Rico | 2 |
| 8 | (Puerto Rico) Josep Becerra Panisello | (Puerto Rico) Bayamon FC | 2 |
| 9 | (Puerto Rico) Olvin Ortiz Rodriguez | (Puerto Rico) Metropolitan FA | 2 |
| 10 | (Puerto Rico) Eloy Matos Velez | (Puerto Rico) Guayama FC | 2 |

Players and clubs in bold still active in competition.
