= Copa Luis Villarejo =

Association football league in Puerto Rico

- Founded: 2016; 10 years ago
- Abolished: 2019; 7 years ago
- Region: Puerto Rico
- Last champions: Bayamón FC; (1st title)
- Most championships: Puerto Rico FC; (1 title); Bayamón FC; (1 title)

The Copa Luis Villarejo was an association football league in Puerto Rico. Created in 2016, it was open to all clubs that are affiliated with the Puerto Rican Football Federation. It was abolished in 2019.

== History ==
=== 2016 ===
A new domestic cup tournament, the Copa Luis Villarejo, was inaugurated and involved teams from the Liga Nacional de Fútbol de Puerto Rico (LNF), the second tier Puerto Rico Soccer League (PRSL), as well as Puerto Rico FC of the North American Soccer League (NASL), a second tier league sanctioned by the United States Soccer Federation.

On November 17, 2016, Puerto Rico FC escaped with a 1-0 win over Bayamón FC in the second leg to complete a 4–0 aggregate victory in the semifinal round of the First Luis Villarejo Cup, Senior Men's category, of the Puerto Rican Football Federation (FPF). The victory, sealed with a penalty goal by its captain, Cristiano Dias, in the 44th minute, gave the PRFC a ticket to the Cup championship game at Estadio Juan Ramón Loubriel de Bayamón against the Criollos, who come from struggling, aggregate 5–4, to Metropolitan FC.

PRFC also joined the Criollos as teams with tickets secured to represent Puerto Rico in the 2017 Champions League Cup of the Caribbean Football Union (CFU), which qualifying for the 2018 CONCACAF Champions League.

On November 20, 2016, Puerto Rico FC defeated Criollos de Caguas FC 4–1 to become the cup's first ever champion, with 3 goals coming from Puerto Rican striker Hector Ramos, and one coming from Jorge Rivera to seal the deal in the 88th minute.

=== 2017–2018 ===
On August 16, 2017, the president of the Competitions Commission of the Puerto Rican Football Federation Alberto Santiago announced the 2nd edition of the Luis Villarejo Cup was scheduled to begin in mid-September of that year. Recalling that the PRFC also had administrative failings and that it had to pay a substantial fine to finally be able to compete. That year the FPF advanced the celebration of the cup to avoid those consequences. The format would remain the same as simple elimination in round-trip series.

On September 3, 2017, the Puerto Rican Football Federation announced it was ready to celebrate the annual Luis Villarejo Cup starting that September with 6 registered clubs, with the clubs being defending champion Puerto Rico FC, Bayamón FC, Caguas Sporting FC, Metropolitan Football Academy, Mayaguez FC, and newcomer to the tournament Club Deportivo Barbosa. The FPF would be holding the congress of the Cup on Wednesday, September 6, if there is no time against Hurricane Irma. Other clubs, such as Don Bosco FC (Puerto Rico), and others who did not submit everything required before the closing of the call could enter.

On September 29, the FBF announced the 2nd Luis Villarejo Cup was suspended, due to the devastation left by Hurricane Maria that had left the entire island powerless. The federation was looking to restart the cup in November, if all teams were available. However, the cup was not played in 2017 or 2018.

=== 2019 ===
On February 12, 2019, the Puerto Rico Football Federation announced that the cup was coming back for its second edition. Bayamón FC won that edition, defeating Metropolitan 3–1 in the final.

== Past winners and results ==
=== Yearly winner ===
Year	Winner	Score	Runner-up	Venue	Attendance	Ref.
2016	Puerto Rico FC	4–1	Criollos de Caguas FC	Juan Ramón Loubriel Stadium		
2019	Bayamón	3–1	Metropolitan FA	Juan Ramón Loubriel Stadium		

=== Team results ===
Team	Winners	Runners-up	Years won	Years runners-up	# of X participated
Puerto Rico FC	1	0	2016	—	2
Criollos de Caguas FC	0	1	—	2016	1
Don Bosco FC	0	0			1
Caguas Sporting FC	0	0			2
Metropolitan FA	0	1	—	2019	2
Bayamon FC	1	0	2019	—	2
Mayagüez FC	0	0			2
Guayama FC	0	0			1
Club Deportivo Barbosa	0	0			1

== Players records ==
=== Career goals ===
Top 10 goalscorers Last updated as of 6 September 2017
Player		Period	Club(s)	Goals
1	(Jamaica) Dale McDonald	2016	Criollos de Caguas FC	9
2	(Puerto Rico) Karlos Ferrer	2016	Metropolitan FA	4
3	(Haiti) Davidson Marseille	2016	Criollos de Caguas FC	4
4	(Puerto Rico) Héctor Ramos	2016	Puerto Rico FC	4
5	(Puerto Rico) Darlin Aquino	2016	Metropolitan FA	3
6	(Jamaica) Tyrone Harrison	2016	Criollos de Caguas FC	3
7	(Puerto Rico) Josep Becerra	2016	Bayamon FC	3
8	(Puerto Rico) Brian Bement	2016	Puerto Rico FC	2
9	(Bermuda) Paul Simmons	2016	Mayagüez FC	2
10	(Puerto Rico) Jorge Rivera	2016	Puerto Rico FC	2
