= 2016 Copa Luis Villarejo =

Tournament details
- Country: Puerto Rico
- Teams: 8

Final positions
- Champions: Puerto Rico FC (1st title)
- Runners-up: Criollos de Caguas
- CFU Club Championship: Puerto Rico FC

Tournament statistics
- Matches played: 13
- Goals scored: 56 (4.31 per match)
- Top goal scorer: (Jamaica) Dale McDonald (9)

Awards
- Best player: -

The 2016 Copa Luis Villarejo was the first edition of the Copa Luis Villarejo, a cup tournament for clubs in Puerto Rico organized by the Puerto Rican Football Federation. The champions and runners-up of this tournament are eligible to enter the 2017 Caribbean Club Championship, which serves as a qualifying tournament for the 2017 CONCACAF League and the 2018 CONCACAF Champions League.

== Teams ==
A total of eight teams participated in this tournament.

- Bayamón - LNF & PRSL
- Caguas Sporting - PRSL
- Criollos de Caguas - LNF
- Don Bosco - PRSL
- Guayama - LNF
- Metropolitan - PRSL
- Mayagüez - PRSL
- Puerto Rico FC - NASL

== Bracket ==
1st Round
Guayama FC	0	0	0
Puerto Rico FC	4	2	6
Caguas Sporting FC	0	0	0
0	Bayamón FC	2	6	9
Metropolitan FA	1	4	5
Mayagüez FC	2	1	3
Don Bosco FC	0	2	2
Criollos de Caguas FC	5	9	14

2nd Round
Puerto Rico FC	3	1	4
Bayamón FC	0	0	0
Metropolitan FA	2	2	4
Criollos de Caguas FC	4	1	5

Final
Puerto Rico FC	4
Criollos de Caguas FC	1

== First round ==
=== First legs ===
30 October 2016
16:00

Don Bosco FC	2–9	Criollos de Caguas FC
Louis Jordan 70'; Alexander Santiago 85'	Report	Dale McDonald 9', 25', 29', 40'; Davidson Marseille 19', 68', 76'; Andony Burgos 78'; Antonio Pacheco 84'

Oratorio San Juan Bosco, Santurce

2 November 2016
20:00

Metropolitan FC	4–1	Mayagüez FC
Karlos Ferrer 45', 60', 69', 83'	Report	Paul Simmons 73'

Reparto Metropolitano, San Juan

2 November 2016
21:00

Bayamón FC	6–0	Caguas Sporting FC
Jorge Rosa; Carmelo Carrillo; Josep Becerra; Ryan López; Josep; Josep	Report

Bayamón Soccer Complex, Bayamón

4 November 2016
20:30

Puerto Rico FC	2–0	Guayama FC
Ramos 54'; Sidney Rivera 56'	Report

Bayamón Soccer Complex, Bayamón

=== Second legs ===
5 November 2016
20:00

Criollos de Caguas FC	5–0	Don Bosco FC
Dale McDonald 10', 38', 41', 48'; Andrés Cabrero 11'	Report

Villa del Rey, Caguas

Criollos de Caguas FC won 14–2 on aggregate.

5 November 2016
20:30

Mayagüez FC	2–1	Metropolitan FC
Bermudes; Paul Simmons	Report	Martin Gardarian

Base Ramey, Aguadilla

Metropolitan FC won 5–3 on aggregate.

6 November 2016
19:30

Caguas Sporting FC	0–2	Bayamón FC
	Report	Jorge Rosa; Carlos Martin

Bayamón Soccer Complex, Bayamón

Bayamón FC won 8–0 on aggregate.

6 November 2016
16:00

Guayama FC	0–4	Puerto Rico FC
	Report	Jorge Rivera 23'; Brian Bement 38', 43'; Oliver Minatel 74'

Área Recreativa de la Urbanización Vives, Guayama

Puerto Rico FC won 6–0 on aggregate.

== Semi-finals ==
=== First legs ===
9 November 2016
21:00

Metropolitan FC	2–4	Criollos de Caguas FC
Darlin Aquino 4'; Alvaro Torres 63'	Report	Tyrone Harrison 12', 41', 61'; Davidson Marseille 60'

Reparto Metropolitano, San Juan

10 November 2016
21:00

Bayamón FC	0–3	Puerto Rico FC
	Report	Kyle Culbertson 14'; Joseph Marrero 45'; Oliver Minatel 59'

Bayamón Soccer Complex, Bayamón

=== Second legs ===
13 November 2016
20:00

Criollos de Caguas FC	1–2	Metropolitan FC
Dwayne Phidd 90'	Report	Darlin Aquino 67', 92'

Villa del Rey, Caguas

Criollos de Caguas FC won 5–4 on aggregate.

16 November 2016
19:30

Puerto Rico FC	1–0	Bayamón FC
Cristiano Dias 44' Pen	Report

Juan Ramón Loubriel Stadium, Bayamón

Puerto Rico FC won 4–0 on aggregate.

== Final ==
20 November 2016
19:30

Puerto Rico FC	4–1	Criollos de Caguas FC
Ramos; Ramos; Ramos; J. Rivera 88'	Report	Dale McDonald 63'

Juan Ramón Loubriel Stadium, Bayamón

2016 Copa Luis Villarejo
Winners
Puerto Rico FC
First Title

== Top goalscorers ==
Rank	Name	Club	Goals
1	(Jamaica) Dale McDonald	Criollos de Caguas FC	9
2	(Puerto Rico) Karlos Ferrer	Metropolitan FA	4
2	(Haiti) Davidson Marseille	Criollos de Caguas FC	4
2	(Puerto Rico) Héctor Ramos	Puerto Rico FC	4
3	(Puerto Rico) Darlin Aquino	Metropolitan FA	3
3	(Jamaica) Tyrone Harrison	Criollos de Caguas FC	3
3	(Puerto Rico) Josep Becerra	Bayamón FC	3
