= 2017 Puerto Rico Soccer League season =

Puerto Rico Soccer League season

Puerto Rico Soccer League
- Season: 2017
- Champions: GPS Puerto Rico
- Matches: 44
- Goals: 203 (4.61 per match)
- Biggest home win: FCM 14-1 BAL (June 22)
- Biggest away win: CAF 2-8 FCM (June 4)
- Highest scoring: FCM 14-1 BAL (June 22)

The 2017 Puerto Rico Soccer League season would be the 9th and final season as Puerto Rico's top-division football league.

== League News ==
- On January 31, 2017; At the headquarters of the Recreation and Sports Department, negotiations took place between Puerto Rico's top clubs and the Puerto Rican Football Federation (FPF) to outline the future of men's top football.
- On February 22, 2017; The Puerto Rico Soccer League (PRSL) announced they will be celebrating their 3rd Cup of Excellence with 8 teams known to participate. The Cup of Excellence will begin from 28 to 30 April 2017 and end around June playing a single lap, carnival style, to save costs to teams.
  - Clubs(7/8) : Caguas Sporting FC, Ballista FC, FC Mayaguez, Bayamón FC, Club Deportivo Barbosa, and last years champion Metropolitan FA. Also newly created club Global Premier Soccer (GPS) Puerto Rico will be participating as well.
- On February 23, 2017; Club Atlético Fajardo was confirmed to be participating in the Excellence Cup III, becoming the 8th club to participate.
- On March 1, 2017; Fraigcomar SC in the San Francisco neighborhood of San Juan returns for the first time since 2007 to a higher category and will be in the Excellence Cup III.
- On March 29, 2017; A week before the cup began, PRSL announced that Academia Quintana had been accepted into the Cup of Excellence.
- On Sept 4th 2017, the Puerto Rico Soccer League (PRSL) announced it will be holding its next tournament in conjunction with the efforts of the Puerto Rican Federation of Soccer (FPF) Competitions Commission which is scheduled to begin in early October this year. The unification tournament of the Commission of Competitions will be a temporary one for the professional project of first and second division in 2018 according to the new statutes of the FPF.

== 3rd Cup of Excellence ==
List of teams participating in this years 3rd annual Cup of Excellence.

Club name	Neighborhood - City	Venue
Academia Quintana	San Juan	
Club Atlético Fajardo	Fajardo	Fajardo Soccer Complex
Ballista FC	Casa Blanca - Luquillo	Estadio Salamán Estrella
Bayamón FC	Minillas - Bayamón	Bayamón Soccer Complex
Caguas Sporting FC	Caguas	Complejo Deportivo Ángel O. Berrios de la Ciudad Criolla
CD Barbosa	San Juan	José Celso Barbosa Stadium
GPS Puerto Rico	San Juan	--
FC Mayagüez	Cabo Rojo	Rebekka Colgberg Stadium
Fraigcomar SC	San Francisco - San Juan	Fraigcomar Field
Metropolitan FA	Metropolitana - San Juan	Estadio Reparto Metropolitano

=== Standings ===
Pos	Team	Pld	W	D	L	GF	GA	GD	Pts
1	GPS Puerto Rico	9	9	0	0	32	5	+27	27
2	Bayamón FC	9	8	0	1	39	8	+31	24
3	Metropolitan FA	9	5	2	2	18	10	+8	17
4	Caguas Sporting FC	9	4	2	3	26	19	+7	14
5	Academia Quintana	9	4	1	4	17	17	0	13
6	FC Mayagüez	9	4	0	5	36	32	+4	12
7	Fraigcomar SC	8	3	1	4	15	13	+2	10
8	CD Barbosa	8	3	0	5	10	15	−5	9
9	Ballista FC	9	0	1	8	8	38	−30	1
10	Club Atlético Fajardo	9	0	1	8	5	49	−44	1

=== Playoff Bracket ===
Semifinals
1	GPS Puerto Rico
4
2	Bayamón FC	3
3	Metropolitan FA	1

Finals
GPS Puerto Rico	2
Bayamón FC	1

=== Statistical leaders ===
==== Top scorers ====
Rank	Player	Nation	Club	Goals
1	Josep Becerra Panisello	ESP	Bayamón	18
2	Miguel Rivera	PUR	Caguas Sporting	11
3	Anythony Martinez	PUR	GPS Puerto Rico	9
4	Dennis Beltre	PUR	Mayagüez	8
5	Eloy Matos	PUR	Mayagüez	8
6	Aldemar Ortiz	PUR	Bayamón	7
7	Clemen Varas	PUR	Fraigcomar	5
8	6 players			4
