= 2016 Puerto Rico Soccer League season =

Puerto Rico Soccer League
- Season: 2016
- Champions: Metropolitan FA

The 2016 Puerto Rico Soccer League season is the 8th season as Puerto Rico's top-division football league.

== Teams ==
| Club name | City | Venue | Participated in | Participated in | |
| Club name | City | Venue | Copa Luis Villarejo | Apertura | Clausura |
|---|---|---|---|---|---|
| Academia Quintana | San Juan | Brenda García Stadium | No | Yes | Yes |
| Club Atlético Fajardo | Fajardo | Fajardo Soccer Stadium | No | Yes | Yes |
| Ballista FC | Rio Grande | Estadio Salamán Estrella | No | Yes | Yes |
| Bayamón FC | Bayamón | Bayamón Soccer Complex | Yes | Yes | Yes |
| Atléticos de Levittown FC (CAL) | Levittown | | No | No | No |
| Caguas Sporting FC | Caguas | Complejo Deportivo Ángel O. Berrios de la Ciudad Criolla | Yes | Yes | Yes |
| CD Barbosa | San Juan | José Celso Barbosa Stadium | No | Yes | Yes |
| Don Bosco FC | San Juan | Don Bosco Stadium | Yes | Yes | Yes |
| Fénix FC | Vega Baja | Complejo Deportivo Tortuguero | No | Yes | No |
| Huracán FC | Caguas | Yldefonso Solá Morales Stadium | No | No | No |
| Leal Arecibo FC | Arecibo | Estadio Polideportivo de Arecibo | No | Yes | Yes |
| FC Mayagüez | Cabo Rojo | Rebekka Colgberg Stadium | Yes | Yes | Yes |
| Metropolitan FA | San Juan | Estadio Reparto Metropolitano | Yes | Yes | Yes |
| SPDP Spartans | San Juan | José Celso Barbosa Stadium | No | Yes | No |
| Yabuco FC | Yabucoa | Yabucoa Athletics Field | No | Yes | Yes |
| Isabela FC | Isabela | Isabela Athletics Field | No | Yes | No |

== Standings ==
=== Apertura ===
| Pos | Team | Pld | W | D | L | GF | GA | GD | Pts |
|---|---|---|---|---|---|---|---|---|---|
| 1 | Academia Quintana | 13 | 11 | 2 | 0 | 47 | 10 | +37 | 35 |
| 2 | Metropolitan FA | 13 | 9 | 3 | 1 | 29 | 9 | +20 | 30 |
| 3 | Atlético Fajardo | 13 | 7 | 5 | 1 | 39 | 19 | +20 | 26 |
| 4 | Bayamón FC | 13 | 8 | 0 | 5 | 34 | 17 | +17 | 24 |
| 5 | Yabuco FC | 13 | 6 | 5 | 2 | 30 | 16 | +14 | 23 |
| 6 | Ballista FC | 13 | 7 | 2 | 4 | 28 | 19 | +9 | 23 |
| 7 | CD Barbosa | 13 | 6 | 3 | 4 | 21 | 14 | +7 | 21 |
| 8 | SPDP Spartans | 13 | 6 | 2 | 5 | 28 | 15 | +13 | 20 |
| 9 | Leal Arecibo FC | 13 | 6 | 1 | 6 | 34 | 25 | +9 | 19 |
| 10 | Don Bosco FC | 13 | 4 | 3 | 6 | 27 | 35 | −8 | 15 |
| 11 | Caguas Sporting FC | 13 | 3 | 2 | 8 | 15 | 28 | −13 | 11 |
| 12 | Mayagüez FC | 13 | 2 | 1 | 10 | 12 | 49 | −37 | 7 |
| 13 | Yabuco Isabela FC | 13 | 1 | 1 | 11 | 16 | 57 | −41 | 4 |
| 14 | Fénix FC | 13 | 0 | 1 | 12 | 4 | 58 | −54 | 1 |

=== Clausura ===
| Pos | Team | Pld | W | D | L | GF | GA | GD | Pts |
|---|---|---|---|---|---|---|---|---|---|
| 1 | Bayamón FC | 10 | 8 | 2 | 0 | 37 | 10 | +27 | 26 |
| 2 | Metropolitan FA | 10 | 8 | 1 | 1 | 29 | 11 | +18 | 25 |
| 3 | Academia Quintana | 10 | 6 | 1 | 3 | 33 | 20 | +13 | 19 |
| 4 | Atlético Fajardo | 10 | 6 | 0 | 4 | 22 | 23 | −1 | 18 |
| 5 | Leal Arecibo FC | 10 | 5 | 1 | 4 | 25 | 18 | +7 | 16 |
| 6 | Mayagüez FC | 10 | 5 | 0 | 5 | 24 | 27 | −3 | 15 |
| 7 | Don Bosco FC | 10 | 4 | 2 | 4 | 30 | 27 | +3 | 14 |
| 8 | CD Barbosa | 10 | 3 | 2 | 5 | 15 | 19 | −4 | 11 |
| 9 | Yabuco FC | 10 | 3 | 1 | 6 | 15 | 26 | −11 | 10 |
| 10 | Caguas Sporting FC | 10 | 0 | 1 | 9 | 11 | 31 | −20 | 1 |
| 11 | Ballista FC | 9 | 0 | 1 | 8 | 8 | 37 | −29 | 1 |

Updated to match(es) played on unknown. Source:

== Playoffs ==
Semifinals
1 | Metropolitan FA
4 | Atlético Fajardo
2 | Academia Quintana
3 | Bayamón FC

Finals
Metropolitan FA | 0 | 2 | 3 Pen
Bayamón FC | 0 | 2 | 1 Pen

== Player statistics ==
=== Apertura Season Top Scorers ===
| Rank | Player | Club | Goals |
|---|---|---|---|
| 1 | (Puerto Rico) | | |
| 2 | (Puerto Rico) | | |
| 3 | (Puerto Rico) | | |
| 4 | (Puerto Rico) | | |
| 5 | (Puerto Rico) | | |
| 6 | (Puerto Rico) | | |
| 7 | (Puerto Rico) | | |
| 8 | (Puerto Rico) | | |
| 9 | (Puerto Rico) | | |
| 10 | (Puerto Rico) | | |

=== Clausura Season Top Scorers ===
| Rank | Player | Club | Goals |
|---|---|---|---|
| 1 | (Spain) Joseph Becerra | Bayamón FC | 16 |
| - | (Puerto Rico) Dennis Beltre | Don Bosco FC (Puerto Rico) | 16 |
| 3 | (Bermuda) Paul Simmons | Mayaguez FC | 14 |
| 4 | (Puerto Rico) Alejandro López Jiménez | Leal Arecibo FC (LEAL) | 8 |
| - | (Puerto Rico) Karlos Ferrer Mojica | Metropolitan FA | 8 |
| 6 | (Puerto Rico) Shaquille Santos | Don Bosco FC (Puerto Rico) | 7 |
| - | (Puerto Rico) Luis Bermúdez Fernández | Academia Quintana | 7 |
| - | (Puerto Rico) Kelvin Quiñonez Rivera | Academia Quintana | 7 |
| 9 | (Jamaica) Dwayne Phidd | Atlético Fajardo | 6 |
| - | (Puerto Rico) José A. Vélez Padín | Leal Arecibo FC (LEAL) | 6 |

As of January 23, 2017
