= 2019–20 Liga Puerto Rico season =

Liga Puerto Rico
- Dates: October 19, 2019 - August 8th, 2020
- Champions: Abandoned.
- Matches: 202
- Goals: 498 (2.47 per match)
- Biggest home win: GPS Puerto Rico 18–1 Balompie Junqueño (19 January 2020)
- Biggest away win: Balompie Junqueño 0–12 Leal Arecibo FC (24 November 2019) Ramey SC 0–12 Bayamon FC (2 February 2020)

The 2019–20 Liga Puerto Rico season was to be the second season of the Liga Puerto Rico, the top tier soccer league on the island. Metropolitan FA were the reigning champions because of their 2018–19 Liga Puerto Rico championship.

The season started on October 19th, 2019 and stopped playing on March 8th, 2020. The season was abandoned in August 2020 because of the COVID-19 pandemic and no new champion was named.

== Standings ==
League standings at abandonment, of August 9th, 2020.

	Team	GP	W	D	L	GF	GA	GD	Pts.
1	Bayamon FC	14	12	2	0	75	6	+	38
2	Metropolitan FA	15	12	1	2	59	21	+	37
3	GPS Puerto Rico	15	11	3	1	67	16	+	36
4	Guaynabo Gol SC	16	10	0	6	41	34	+	30
5	FC Mayagüez	16	8	3	5	43	19	+	27
6	Don Bosco FC	15	8	2	5	37	34	+3	26
7	Caguas Sporting FC	16	6	2	8	37	28	+	20
8	Leal Arecibo FC	16	6	1	9	41	33	+	19
9	Mirabelli SA	16	5	3	8	21	33	+	18
10	Puerto Rico Sol FC	16	5	1	10	23	41	+	16
11	Academia Quintana	15	3	3	9	28	51	+	12
12	Club de Balompie Junqueño	16	2	1	13	14	102	+	7
13	Ramey SC	16	2	0	14	12	80	+	6

=== Top goalscorers ===
Rank	Player	Club	Goals
1	(Puerto Rico) José I. González	FC Mayagüez	18
2	(Argentina) Adrián Oviedo	Metropolitan FA	17
3	(Puerto Rico) Dennis Beltré	Don Bosco FC	15
4	(Puerto Rico) Alejandro Lopez	Leal Arecibo FC	13
4	(Puerto Rico) Jose Lopez	Bayamón FC	13
6	(Puerto Rico) Jan Mateo	GPS Puerto Rico	12
6	(Puerto Rico) Esdras Mendez	GPS Puerto Rico	12
8	4 Others		10

Source Liga Puerto Rico
