= 2015 Puerto Rico Soccer League season =

2015 Puerto Rico Soccer League
- Season: 2015
- Champions: SPDP Spartans
- Promoted: N/a
- Relegated: N/a
- Goals scored: 245

The 2015 Puerto Rico Soccer League season did not take place in 2015. Teams then participated in the 2nd Excellence Cup, which was established in its place for the season.

== PRSL 2nd Excellence Cup ==
Pos	Team	Pld	W	D	L	GF	GA	GD	Pts
1	SPDP Spartans	10	7	3	0	34	10	+24	24
2	Academia Quintana	10	6	4	0	44	13	+31	22
3	Metropolitan FA	10	6	3	1	34	11	+23	21
4	Mayaguez FC	10	6	3	1	28	15	+13	21
5	Club Deportivo Barbosa	10	3	5	2	24	19	+5	14
6	Don Bosco FC (Puerto Rico)	10	3	3	4	23	21	+2	12
7	CHFC	10	2	4	4	18	24	−6	10
8	Brazilian Soccer Academy	10	3	1	6	9	26	−17	10
9	Leal Arecibo FC	10	2	3	5	13	16	−3	9
10	CA Levittown	10	1	3	6	13	21	−8	6
11	Fenix FC	10	0	0	10	5	66	−61	0
