= Juan O'Neill =

Puerto Rican footballer

Personal information
- Full name: Juan Ignacio O'Neill De Corral
- Date of birth: July 12, 1998 (age 28)
- Place of birth: Guaynabo, Puerto Rico
- Height: 5 ft 7 in (1.70 m)
- Position: Midfielder

Team information
- Current team: Academia Quintana
- Number: 23

College career
Years	Team	Apps	(Gls)
2018–2019	Assumption Greyhounds	28	(1)
2020–2022	Santa Clara Broncos	25	(1)

Senior career*
Years	Team	Apps	(Gls)
2017	GPS Puerto Rico		
2022	Project 51O	4	(0)
2024	Black Rock FC	2	(0)
2025–	Academia Quintana	20	(1)

International career^{‡}
2017–	Puerto Rico	21	(0)
- * Club domestic league appearances and goals as of 21 March 2026 ‡ National team caps and goals as of 19 May 2025

Juan Ignacio O'Neill De Corral (born July 12, 1998) is a Puerto Rican football player who plays as a midfielder for Academia Quintana. He also plays for the Puerto Rico national football team.

== Career statistics ==
=== International ===
As of matches played 28 January 2019.

National team	Year	Apps	Goals
Puerto Rico	2017	3	0
Puerto Rico	2018	0	0
Total		3	0
