= Club de Fútbol Fraigcomar =

Puerto Rican association football club

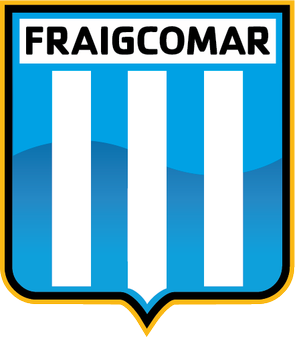
- Full name: Club de Fútbol Fraigcomar
- Nickname: Fraigco
- Founded: 1986; 40 years ago
- Stadium: Estadio San Francisco, San Juan, Puerto Rico
- Capacity: 2,000
- President: Antonio Pirillo
- Head Coach: Elgy Morales
- League: Liga Puerto Rico Pro
- 2024 Apertura: Regular Season: 10th

Club de Fútbol Fraigcomar is a Puerto Rican association football club, located in San Francisco, a subbarrio of San Juan Antiguo, which is a barrio of San Juan, Puerto Rico. On February 28, 2017; the club announced it will return for the first time since 2007 to a higher category and will be in the Excellence Cup III.

== History ==
=== 1985–2004 ===
The organization was founded in 1985 when a group of parents decided to improve a park in San Ignacio de Río Piedras to teach football to children. After some time that park became one of the most notable in the country.

In 1990 Fraigcomar finally converted into a football club and started showing their potential in the youth squads, especially in under 10. During the nineties Fraigcomar became a Puerto Rican powerhouse in the youth divisions, thanks to the coaching of Antonio Pirillo, which later became the club's president. During Pirillo's coaching years, he had the first teams to win former youth powerhouses; Quintana and Don Bosco. The club is known to host an intramural tournament, in which occasionally the best players in each age group are chosen to compete abroad and against other Puerto Rican clubs. Now the Club is one of the largest in Puerto Rico with more than 800 football players and more than 10 men's and women's youth football teams.

In 1993 the club started to play in senior level and a few years later with their women's team.

=== 2005–2007 ===
- League: Liga Mayor de Fútbol Nacional 2005
- League: Campeonato Nacional de Fútbol de Puerto Rico 2005-2007

==== LMFN ====
In 2005 the team participated in the Liga Mayor de Fútbol Nacional, with 6 teams participating: Fraigcomar (Río Piedras), Real Quintana de San Juan, Huracanes de Caguas, Atléticos de Añasco (Cabo Rojo), Vaqueros de Bayamón, Tornados de Humacao, Brujos de Guayama who apparently withdrew before season began.

The team played 10 league games finishing with record of 7 and 3, losing to Real Quintana i the finals to a score 2 - 1. Gabriel Castro was the team's leading scorer with 6 goals.

==== FPR FCN ====
The LMFN teams would then join other clubs from the Liga Premier Fútbol Puerto Rico to be a part of the Federación Puertorriqueña de Fútbol's Campeonato Nacional 2005, which concluded in December, to crown the overall National League Champion.

Campeonato Nacional de Fútbol de Puerto Rico, became the first organized tournament to unify the domestic football scene established by the Federación Puertorriqueña de Fútbol.

In 2005 the team finally established as the best football team in Puerto Rico, winning the senior championship in three successive years from 2005–07 while also winning five of the seven youth categories.

=== Return to Professional soccer ===
==== 2017 season ====
The club headed by Argentinean Antonio Pirillo, will make his debut in the Puerto Rico Soccer League with experienced Costa Rican coach Elgy Morales. Fraigcomar will debut in the official inauguration of the tournament next Saturday April 8, 2017 before rival, and current champions of the Puerto Rico Soccer League, Metropolitan Football Academy, both of the capital city. In their only friendly match of the year, the Franciscans of Fraigcomar defeated the 2-0 metropolitan players in the Bayamon City Cup.

== Current squad ==
Note: Flags indicate national team as defined under FIFA eligibility rules; some limited exceptions apply. Players may hold more than one non-FIFA nationality.

No. / Pos. / Nation / Player; — / / / Jonathan Genero	No. / Pos. / Nation / Player

== Achievements ==
This is a list of the senior team achievements.

=== League ===
- Campeonato Nacional de Fútbol de Puerto Rico: 3

Champions (3): 2005, 2006, 2007

=== Domestic ===
- Torneo de Copa de Puerto Rico: 1

Champions (1): 2006

=== Year-by-year ===
Season	PRSL									Playoffs	CFU Club Championship	Top goalscorer		Managers
Season	Div.	Pos.	Pl.	W	D	L	GS	GA	P	Playoffs	CFU Club Championship	Name	League	Managers
2017	1st	7th	8	3	1	4	15	13	10	DNQ	Did not qualify	(Puerto Rico) Clemen Varas	5	(Costa Rica) Elgy Morales
Season	LPR									Playoffs	CFU Club Championship	Top goalscorer		Managers
Season	Div.	Pos.	Pl.	W	D	L	GS	GA	P	Playoffs	CFU Club Championship	Name	League	Managers
2021	1st	5th	6	2	1	3	15	9	7	DNQ	Did not qualify			
2022	1st	5th	14	7	2	5	42	28	23	DNQ	Did not qualify			
Season	LPR PRO									Playoffs	CFU Club Championship	Top goalscorer		Managers
Season	Div.	Pos.	Pl.	W	D	L	GS	GA	P	Playoffs	CFU Club Championship	Name	League	Managers
2024–25 A	1st	10th	9	0	0	9	4	41	0	DNQ	Did not qualify			

== Coaches ==
=== Superior ===
- Julio Fernandez 1998–present
- Elgy Morales 2016–2019
- Nelson Ruiz 2016– [Women's branch]
- Carlos Trinidad Castillo (Pepe) 2008
