= UPRA =

UPRA may refer to:

- Ukrainian People's Revolutionary Army
- University of Puerto Rico at Aguadilla
- University of Puerto Rico at Arecibo
