= Ballista FC =

Association football team from Puerto Rico

- Full name: Ballista Futbol Club
- Founded: 2016
- Stadium: Complejo Deportivo Jose Salaman Estrella; Luquillo, Puerto Rico
- Capacity: 1,000
- League: Puerto Rico Soccer League
- 2016: 10th
- Website: http://www.ballistafc.com/
Home colors	Away colors

Ballista Futbol Club was an association football team that played in Luquillo. They played in the Puerto Rico Soccer League.

== History ==
On December 4, 2015; Ballista FC was already moving to meet all the requirements to be admitted as a club and league franchisee of the Puerto Rico Soccer League. They planned to establish an academy, tentatively in the municipality of Rio Grande, where children of poor resources of the municipality can participate for free. Former Levittown Athletic Club staff have become members of the Ballista FC Board of Directors with signings of Sigfredo Gumá as General Manager, Arnaldo Escobar as president, Julio Steuart as vice president, and Elliot Rivera as Treasurer.

After months of searching and negotiations with the municipalities of Canóvanas, Rio Grande and Luquillo, the club vice president Julio Stuart, reached an agreement and found a home on the Riviera Pitihaya River in the municipality of Luquillo, Puerto Rico with El Complejo Deportivo José Salamán Estrella as it home field.

== Colors and badge ==
=== Kit manufacturers ===
- 2016–2017: Luanvi

=== Shirt sponsors ===
- 2016: None
- 2017:

== Squad ==
April 10, 2016 Note: Flags indicate national team as defined under FIFA eligibility rules; some limited exceptions apply. Players may hold more than one non-FIFA nationality.

No.	Pos.	Nation	Player
7	MF	COL	Ronal Salas Contreras
17	MF	PUR	Ricardo Torres
18	DF	PUR	Axel E Betancourt Rivera
20	MF	PUR	Iván Padilla Virella
23	MF	PUR	Yonandy Jimenez
10	MF	ARG	Ernesto Fidel Guerrero
3	DF	PUR	Denzel G. David Ramos
29	MF	COL	Sergio Andres Paez Suna
15	MF	COL	Daniel E. Gaviria Sáenz
89	DF	USA	Franjavier González Castillo
33	MF	PUR	Luis Alberto Garcia Rodriguez
6	MF	ARG	Augusto Giménez Casset

No.	Pos.	Nation	Player
30	MF	PUR	Jan Luis Figueroa Vega
16	MF	PUR	Wilson Olmeda Colón
1	GK	PUR	José E. Del Valle Coriano
5	DF	PUR	Luis Alberto Sanchez Lopez
19	DF	PUR	Christian G. Negron Anqueira
22	DF	PUR	Christopher Cruz Dorríos
12	GK	COL	Andres Felipe Cardona Castrillon
24	MF	PUR	Joshua Andujar
21	MF	PUR	Santos Rivera Mariño

== 2017 ==
=== Matches ===
==== Friendlies ====
- March 5, 2017 4:00 pm: Vs. Caguas Sporting FC
  - Location: Pista José Salaman Estrella
    - Result:

== Transfers ==
=== In ===
Date	Position	Nationality	Name	From	Fee	Ref.
June 20, 2016	GK	PUR	Edgar Louis Colon Soto	Liga del sur Sosol (Superior) Coamo Fútbol club		
June 22, 2016		PUR	Heriberto Negron	U-20 Bayamon FC		
July 6, 2016		PUR	Jose Birriel	Pro Direct Soccer Academy España (Malaga).		
July 6, 2016		PUR	Izander "Coochie" Ortiz	Mirabelli SC		
July 7, 2016		PUR	Edwin "Españita" Montes colon	Fluminense Levittown		
July 7, 2016		PUR	Jose G Rosa	U-21 Cariduros		
July 7, 2016	MF	PUR	Pedro O. Hernandez Santiago	Don Bosco FC (Puerto Rico)		
July 8, 2016		PUR	Hector L. Berrios Quintero	Liga del sur Sosol (Superior); FC Leones		

== Club hierarchy ==
=== Team management ===
Executive
General Manager	Sigfredo Gumá
President	Arnaldo Escobar
Vice president	Julio Steuart
Club Treasure	Elliot Rivera
Director of Soccer	Alejandro Trionfini
Assistant	Fidel Guerrero
Coaching staff
Head coach	Pedro Armstrong
Assistant coach	
Assistant coach	
Goalkeeping coach	
Performance coach	
Head trainer	
Youth technical coordinator	

Last updated: March 6, 2015

=== Year-by-year ===
Season	PRSL									Overall	CFU Club Championship	Top goalscorer		Managers
Season	Div.	Pos.	Pl.	W	D	L	GS	GA	P	Overall	CFU Club Championship	Name	League	Managers
2016	Apertura	6th	13	7	2	4	28	19	23	10th	Did not enter	(Puerto Rico)		(Puerto Rico)
2016	Clausura	11th	9	0	1	8	8	37	1	10th	Did not enter	(Puerto Rico)		(Puerto Rico)
