= Pista Atletica Aguadilla =

- Interactive map of Pista Atletica Aguadilla
- Location: Arch Road; Aguadilla, Puerto Rico
- Coordinates: 18.4970°N 67.1374°W
- Capacity: 1,000
- Surface: Grass

Tenant
- Ramey SC

The Pista Atletica Aguadilla is a 1,000-seat association football stadium on the campus of the University of Puerto Rico at Aguadilla in Aguadilla, Puerto Rico. As of the 2019-20 Liga Puerto Rico season, it hosts the home matches of Ramey SC.
