= 2022–23 Liga Puerto Rico season =

Liga Puerto Rico
- Season: 2022–23
- Champions: Apertura: Metropolitan FA (3rd title); Clausura: Metropolitan FA (4th title)
- Stats are from the regular season only Source

The 2022–23 Liga Puerto Rico season, was the fourth season of Liga Puerto Rico. It was the league's first season to be divided into two championships: the Apertura 2022 and the Clausura 2023, each in an identical format and each contested by eight teams. The season was played in a round robin style, with the top four making the playoffs.

== Torneo Apertura ==
=== League table ===
Pos	Team	Pld	W	D	L	GF	GA	GD	Pts
1	Metropolitan FA	8	7	0	1	26	7	+19	21
2	Puerto Rico Sol FC	8	5	1	2	12	10	+2	16
3	Bayamón FC	8	2	2	4	9	13	−4	8
4	Academia Quintana	8	2	1	5	16	18	−2	7
5	Caguas Sporting FC	8	1	2	5	5	20	−15	5

Updated to match(es) played on December 4, 2022. Source:

Apertura Changes
▲ Joining	▼ Leaving
None	FC Mayagüez
	Guaynabo Gol SC
	Fraigcomar

=== Regular season statistics ===
==== Top goalscorers ====
Source:

=== Playoffs – Apertura 2022 ===
==== Semi-Finals ====
December 7, 2022
17:30 CST (UTC−6)

Metropolitan FA	4–2	Academia Quintana

Referee: - (Puerto Rico)
December 7, 2022
20:30 CST (UTC−6)

Bayamon FC	2–2 (6-7)	Puerto Rico Sol FC

Referee: - (Puerto Rico)

==== Championship ====
December 11, 2022
19:00 CST (UTC−6)

Metropolitan FA	1-1	Puerto Rico Sol FC
Franco López 53'		Kevin Pagan 36'
Penalties
Franco López (penalty scored); Julián Terrón (penalty scored); Sebastián Díaz (penalty missed); Matias Maroni (penalty scored); Héctor Ramos (penalty scored)	4–3	Andrés Cabrero (penalty scored); Sebastian Soto (penalty missed); Jeremy Roldan (penalty missed); Fernando Guzman (penalty scored); Kevin Pagan (penalty scored)

Mayaguez
Referee: - (Puerto Rico)

LPR Champions
Metropolitan FA
3rd title
Livestream

== Torneo Clausura ==
=== League table ===
Pos	Team	Pld	W	D	L	GF	GA	GD	Pts
1	Metropolitan FA	5	3	2	0	13	2	+11	11
2	Academia Quintana	5	2	2	1	12	6	+6	8
3	Puerto Rico Sol FC	5	2	1	2	5	6	−1	7
4	Don Bosco FC	5	2	0	3	8	12	−4	6
5	FC Mayagüez	5	1	2	2	3	6	−3	5
6	Caguas Sporting FC	5	1	1	3	7	16	−9	4

Updated to match(es) played on May 13, 2023. Source:

Clausura Changes
▲ Joining	▼ Leaving
Don Bosco FC	Bayamón FC
FC Mayagüez	

=== Regular season statistics ===
==== Top goalscorers ====
Source:

=== Playoffs – Clausura 2023 ===
==== Semi-Finals ====
May 27, 2023
17:30 CST (UTC−6)

Metropolitan FA	2–0	Don Bosco FC
	Report

Juan Cordero Dávila Stadium, San Juan
Referee: - (Puerto Rico)
May 27, 2023
20:30 CST (UTC−6)

Academia Quintana	3–0	Puerto Rico Sol FC
	Report

Referee: - (Puerto Rico)

==== Championship ====
June 3, 2023
19:00 CST (UTC−6)

Academia Quintana	1-2	Metropolitan FA
	Report

Mayaguez
Referee: - (Puerto Rico)

LPR Champions
Metropolitan FA
4th title
