= Global Premier Soccer Puerto Rico =

Association football club in Puerto Rico

GPS Puerto Rico
- Full name: Global Premier Soccer Puerto Rico
- Founded: 2015
- Dissolved: 2020
- Ground: Pista Atlética de Torrimar; Guaynabo, Puerto Rico
- Capacity: 1,000
- President: Miguel Morales
- Manager: Alejandro Lain
- League: Liga Puerto Rico
- 2019-20: Regular Season: 3rd

Global Premier Soccer Puerto Rico, commonly known as GPS Puerto Rico was a Puerto Rican football club under the GPS Program. The club played in PRSL and later played in Liga Puerto Rico until June 2020 after its parent organization, Global Premier Soccer (GPS), abruptly collapsed and entered Chapter 7 bankruptcy. Immediately following the collapse, club leadership transitioned the club into Puerto Rico Surf SC

== History ==
The club was established in 2015, formerly known as Conquistadores de Guaynabo before becoming becaming part of the Gobal Premier Soccer. The GPS's main objective was to become a leader in football in Puerto Rico. Its primary focus is the development of young footballers across different age groups, from the youngest players to professionals.

Soon after its establishment, GPS formed a partnership with FC Bayern Munich. As its main partner

== Puerto Rico Soccer League ==
In 2017 GPS Puerto Rico joined PRSL for the 2017 season. They played their first match against Caguas Sporting FC and won 4–2 against Caguas Sporting. GPS Puerto Rico would end their season finishing 1st in the league with them winnings all 9 matches and qualified for the Copa Excelencia III playoffs. GPS Puerto Rico went to the finals facing off against Bayamon FC, GPS would end up winning the Copa Excelencia III beating Bayamon FC 2–1. GPS Puerto Rico also was the last champions of PRSL before the league folded in 2017.

On February 26, 2017 GPS Puerto Rico competed in the 2017 Don Bosco Cup preseason tournament, facing off against Don Bosco FC. They would lose to Don Bosco FC 2–1

== Liga Puerto Rico ==
In 2019 GPS Puerto Rico joined Liga Puerto Rico for the 2019-20 season. They played their first match of the season facing Metropolitan FA, which GPS won 2–1. GPS Puerto Rico would played 15 matches ranking 3rd in the league table, Before the season was abandoned on August 2020.

== Domestic history ==
Key

Champion Runners-up 3rd Place

=== Year-by-year ===
Season	PRSL									Playoffs	CFU Club Championship	Top goalscorer		Managers
Season	Div.	Pos.	Pl.	W	D	L	GS	GA	P	Playoffs	CFU Club Championship	Name	League	Managers
2017	1st	1st	9	9	0	0	32	5	27	1st	Did not enter	(Puerto Rico) Anythony Martinez	9	(Puerto Rico)
Season	LPR Pro									Playoffs	CFU Club Championship	Top goalscorer		Managers
Season	Div.	Pos.	Pl.	W	D	L	GS	GA	P	Playoffs	CFU Club Championship	Name	League	Managers
2019-20	-	3rd	15	11	3	1	41	34	36	Cancelled	Did not enter	(Puerto Rico) Jan Mateo	12	(Puerto Rico)
2020-21	Season Cancelled due to COVID-19													
2021	Merged with Puerto Rico Surf SC													

== Honours ==
- Copa Excelencia III
  - Champions (1): 2017
- Don Bosco Cup
  - Runners-up (1): 2017
