= Yabuco FC =

Soccer team based in Yabucoa, Puerto Rico

- Full name: Club Fútbol Yabuco FC
- Nickname: Yabuco
- Founded: 2014
- Stadium: Pista Atlética Adán Fonseca; Yabucoa, Puerto Rico
- Chairman: Jorge Soto
- Manager: Jose Fernández
- League: Puerto Rico Soccer League
- 2016: 6th

Yabuco FC (formally Yabuco Segunda Unidad Asunción Lugo FC or Yabuco SUAL FC), is a soccer team based in Yabucoa, Puerto Rico. The club plays in the Puerto Rico Soccer League, the premier football division of Puerto Rico.

== History ==
=== 2014 season ===
Yabuco SUAL FC first joined the Liga Nacional de Fútbol de Puerto Rico in 2014, winning the league title in their first season after finishing 2nd in the regular season league table behind Guayama FC. The club finished with 8 wins, 2 draws and 1 loss for 26 points. In the end-of-season playoffs, they defeated Brazilian Soccer Academy 3–2 in the semifinals and defeated Guayama in the finals 8–7 on penalties following a 2–2 draw.

=== 2015 season ===
For the club's second season, the club re-branded from Yabuco SUAL FC to Yabuco FC. Half the teams in the league left leaving 6 teams. The team finished the league in 5th place; ending the season with a record of 3-1-6 for 10 points, missing out the playoffs.

=== 2016 season ===
For the 2016 season, Yabuco FC joined the Puerto Rico Soccer League after many teams have left the Liga Nacional.

In the Apertura season, the club finished with 23 points for 5th place. They ended the apertura season with a record of 6 wins, 5 draws, and 2 losses.

In the Clausura season, the club finished with 10 points for 9th place. They ended the clausura season with a record of 3 wins, 1 draws, and 6 losses.

The club would then miss out on the 2016 PRSL playoffs.

=== Colors and Name ===
The team's colors are purple, green, and white, which are taken from the flag of Yabucoa.

== Records ==
=== Year-by-year ===
Season	PRSL									Overall	CFU Club Championship	Top goalscorer		Managers
Season	Div.	Pos.	Pl.	W	D	L	GS	GA	P	Overall	CFU Club Championship	Name	League	Managers
2016	Apertura	5th	13	6	5	2	30	16	23	6th	Did not enter	(Puerto Rico)		(Puerto Rico)
2016	Clausura	9th	10	3	1	6	15	26	10	6th	Did not enter	(Puerto Rico)		(Puerto Rico)
