= 2015 Bayamon Cup =

Tournament details
- Country: Puerto Rico

Final positions
- Champions: Criollos de Caguas FC

The 2015 Bayamon Cup was the first edition of the Bayamon Cup tournament for the football clubs in Puerto Rico organized by the Puerto Rican Football Federation.

The competition was won by Criollos de Caguas FC.

== Teams ==
Ten teams participated in the tournament.
