= Kevin Hernández =

Kevin Hernández may refer to:

- Kevin Hernández (footballer, born 1985), Honduran footballer
- Kevin Hernández (footballer, born 1999), Puerto Rican footballer
