= Jorge Rivera (footballer, born 1996) =

Puerto Rican association football player

Personal information
- Full name: Jorge Luis Rivera
- Date of birth: March 24, 1996 (age 30)
- Place of birth: San Juan, Puerto Rico
- Height: 1.74 m (5 ft 9 in)
- Position: Midfielder

Team information
- Current team: Don Bosco FC
- Number: 4

Youth career
- Don Bosco

Senior career*
Years	Team	Apps	(Gls)
2015	Guayama	20	(12)
2016–2017	Puerto Rico FC	25	(1)
2018	Penn FC	10	(2)
2019–2021	Don Bosco FC		(8)
2021–2022	Metropolitan FA	3	(3)
2022–2024	Bayamón FC	5	(1)
2024–	Metropolitan FA	63	(64)

International career^{‡}
2012	Puerto Rico U17	3	(0)
2015–	Puerto Rico	8	(1)
- * Club domestic league appearances and goals as of 13:51, 15 October 2018 (UTC) ‡ National team caps and goals as of June 14, 2017

Jorge Luis Rivera (born March 24, 1996) is a Puerto Rican footballer who plays as a midfielder for Don Bosco FC in the Liga Puerto Rico.

== Playing career ==
=== Club ===
==== Guayama FC ====
Rivera played club football for Guayama FC in the 2015 season.

==== Puerto Rico FC ====
On February 26, 2016, Rivera joined the newly created Puerto Rico FC, that set to begin play in the NASL's 2016 fall season.

The 20-year-old starter started four games, came in as a substitute in five and played 343 minutes in the 2016 season. Also scored his first two goals as a professional during the Luis Villarejo Cup. On January 27, 2017, PRFC announced the resigning of Jorge Rivera.

==== Penn FC ====
In February 2018, Rivera signed with Penn FC in the United Soccer League.

==== Don Bosco FC ====
In January 2019, Rivera returned to Puerto Rico to play with Don Bosco FC in the Liga Puerto Rico. He scored his first goal on January 12 against Bayamón FC.

==== Metropolitan FA ====
On December 30th 2025, ESPN released a "Who was 2025's top goal scorer?" article, Rivera was listed 10th with 40 goals in 35 games in the year of 2025.

=== International ===
Rivera made his senior international debut for Puerto Rico in 2015.

On March 26, 2016, Rivera scores his first goal for Puerto Rico national football team against Anguilla in the 42' minute of a 2017 Caribbean Cup qualification match.

== Career statistics ==
=== Club ===
As of match played 8 February 2018

Appearances and goals by club, season and competition
Club	Season	League			National Cup		Other		Total	
Club	Season	Division	Apps	Goals	Apps	Goals	Apps	Goals	Apps	Goals
Guayama	2015	LNF	20	12	0	0	–		20	12
Puerto Rico	2016	NASL	9	0	0	2	–		9	2
Puerto Rico	2017	NASL	16	1	0	0	–		16	1
Penn FC	2018	USL	0	0	0	0	–		0	0
Career total			45	13	0	2	-	-	35	15

=== International ===
Puerto Rico national team
Year	Apps	Goals
2016	7	1
2017	1	0
Total	8	1

Statistics accurate as of match played Junee 13, 2017

=== International goals ===
Scores and results list Puerto Rico's goal tally first.

#	Date	Venue	Opponent	Score	Result	Competition
1.	March 26, 2016	Raymond E. Guishard Technical Centre – The Valley, Anguilla	Anguilla	3–0	4–0	2017 Caribbean Cup qualification

== Honors ==
Puerto Rico FC

- Copa Luis Villarejo: 2016
