= Ramey SC =

Association football club in Puerto Rico

- Full name: Ramey Soccer Club
- Founded: 2004; 22 years ago
- Ground: Pista Atlética Ana Beltrán; Aguadilla, Puerto Rico
- Capacity: 1,000
- Manager: Edgar Rivadeneyra
- League: Liga Puerto Rico
- 2019/20: Abandoned
- Website: https://www.facebook.com/groups/178290899481/

Ramey SC is a Puerto Rican association football club from Aguadilla that currently plays in the Liga Puerto Rico.

== History ==
Ramey SC joined the nascent Liga Puerto Rico for the 2019/20 season which was eventually cancelled because of the COVID-19 pandemic.

== Domestic history ==
Key

Champion Runners-up 3rd Place

Season	League							Domestic Cup	Notes
Season	Div.	Pos.	Pl.	W	D	L	P	Domestic Cup	Notes
2019–20	1st	N/A	16	2	0	14	6		Season abandoned because of COVID-19 pandemic
