= Kevin Hernández (footballer, born 1999) =

Puerto Rican footballer

Personal information
- Full name: Kevin Javier Hernández Hernández
- Date of birth: July 17, 1999 (age 27)
- Place of birth: San Juan, Puerto Rico
- Height: 6 ft 0 in (1.83 m)
- Position: Forward

Team information
- Current team: Puerto Rico Surf SC

College career
Years	Team	Apps	(Gls)
2017–2019	Assumption Greyhounds	51	(15)

Senior career*
Years	Team	Apps	(Gls)
2016	GPS Puerto Rico		
2019–2020	FC Mayagüez		
2020	Satélite Norte FC		
2021-2022	Bayamón FC	4	(3)
2023	Club de Lyon	13	(2)
2024–2025	Academia Quintana	38	(49)
2025–	Puerto Rico Surf SC	50	(42)
Total		105	(96)

International career^{‡}
2018	Puerto Rico U20	4	(2)
2017–	Puerto Rico	7	(0)
- * Club domestic league appearances and goals as of 13 October 2026 ‡ National team caps and goals as of 19 May 2025

Kevin Javier Hernández Hernández (born July 17, 1999) is a Puerto Rican football player who currently plays as a forward for Puerto Rico Surf SC in Liga Puerto Rico Pro.

== Career ==
On December 30th 2025, ESPN released a "Who was 2025's top goal scorer?" article, Hernandez was listed 4th with 48 goals in 37 games in the year of 2025.

== Career statistics ==
=== International ===
As of matches played 12 June 2022.

National team	Year	Apps	Goals
Puerto Rico	2017	1	0
Puerto Rico	2018	1	0
Puerto Rico	2021	3	0
Puerto Rico	2022	2	0
Total		7	0
