= Academia Quintana =

Association football club in Puerto Rico

- Full name: Academia Quintana Fútbol Club
- Nicknames: Onceno del Pueblo (The People's Eleven); La Academia (The Academy)
- Founded: 1969; 57 years ago
- Stadium: Complejo Deportivo Residencial Juan C. Cordero Dávila
- Capacity: 18,000
- Chairman: Benjamin Martinez
- Manager: Elismael Ortiz
- League: Liga Puerto Rico Pro
- 2026 Clausura: Regular Season: 1st Playoff: Finalists
- Website: facebook.com
Home colors	Away colors

Academia Quintana F.C. is a Puerto Rican professional association football club based in San Juan. The team was founded in 1969, making them one of the oldest clubs still in existence in Puerto Rico. The team has won a record 18 nation-wide titles. The team currently plays in the Liga Puerto Rico Pro, playing their home matches at Estadio Benjamín Martínez.

They were one of the founding members of the Puerto Rico Soccer League. The reserve team plays in the Liga Nacional. The club played their home games at the Hiram Bithorn Stadium, formerly sharing the facility with Atléticos de San Juan.

== History ==
Academia Quintana was founded in 1969, playing in a baseball field. The team was named after a public housing project, also known as Residencial César Cordero, since it served to develop several players that lived there.

Before the beginning of the 2008 season the team participated in exhibition games against college teams. Academia Quintana played their debut game on July 5, 2008 against Tornados de Humacao, which they won 5–0. In their second game (against Atléticos de San Juan) the team lost by three goals to two. Academia Quintana then lost its second straight game (against Sevilla FC) on July 20, 2008. Quintana defeated Guaynabo Fluminense FC in their fourth game. On the fifth date of the tournament the team tied with Gigantes de Carolina, with both teams scoring a single goal. On August 10, 2008, Quintana defeated Caguas Huracán. This marked the end of the league's first half, the teams would then compete against each other a second time. In the first two games of this stage, Academia Quintana lost to Club Atletico River Plate Puerto Rico and defeated Tornados de Humacao. To close the regular season, the team won 3 and lost 2 games.

The team opened the 2009 season with a 2–1 loss to Carolina Giants. However, the club finished sixth in the league table and missed the play offs.

A week before the 2017 PRSL season, PRSL officials held a meeting and granted Academia Quintana request to join the Cup of Excellence. It was reported that Quintana fulfilled the economic responsibilities they had with the PRSL and were therefore allowed to enter the cup, demonstrating that the league administration is working seriously to put order and discipline among its members.

The team has won 18 titles during its more than five decades of existence making it the most successful club in Puerto Rico.

In October of 2026, the team released a new kit keeping Young Kingz as it's main sponsor, and made by Boman Sport out of Ecuador.

=== Kit History ===
Kit sponsorship
Kit supplier	Period	Ref.
(Spain) Joma	2022	
Unknown	2023-2026	
(Ecuador) Boman Sport	2026-present	

== Current squad ==
Updated as of 26 October 2026.

Note: Flags indicate national team as defined under FIFA eligibility rules; some limited exceptions apply. Players may hold more than one non-FIFA nationality.

No.	Pos.	Nation	Player
1	GK	PUR	Joel Serrano
-	GK	PUR	Yoksan Rosario
25	GK	PAR	Jeremy Sálamo
—	DF	PUR	Rodolfo Sulia
—	DF	PUR	Rayson Abdel Rosario Diaz
—	DF	ARG	Tomas Fernandez
—	DF	PUR	Adrian Soto
—	DF	PUR	Eitan Solomiany
—	DF	PUR	Carlos Gonzalez
—	DF	PUR	Kendall Pellot
—	MF	PUR	Lorenzo Baez

No.	Pos.	Nation	Player
—	MF	PUR	Gianfranco Capannelli
—	MF	PUR	Luis Bermudez
—	MF	PUR	Jean Morales
—	MF	PUR	Ian Martinez
—	MF	PUR	Juan O'Neill
—	MF	PUR	Samuel Soto
—	MF	PUR	Dante Williams
—	FW	PUR	Jan Luis Rivera
—	FW	PUR	Ricardo Rojas
—	FW	PUR	Adrian Diaz Faisca
—	FW	PUR	Eriesel Hernandez
—	FW	PUR	Ricardo Rivera

=== Notable former players ===
This list of notable former players comprises players who went on to play professional soccer after playing for the team in the Puerto Rico Soccer League, or those who previously played professionally before joining the team.

- (Puerto Rico) - Joseph Marrero (2013, 2019-2026)

== Domestic history ==
=== Year-by-year ===
Season	PRSL									Playoffs	CFU Club Championship	Top goalscorer		Managers
Season	Div.	Pos.	Pl.	W	D	L	GS	GA	P	Playoffs	CFU Club Championship	Name	League	Managers
2015	1st	-							-	-	Did not enter	(Puerto Rico)	-	(Puerto Rico)
2016	Apertura	11th	13	3	2	8	15	28	11	11th	Did not enter	(Puerto Rico)		(Puerto Rico)
2016	Clausura	10th	10	0	1	9	11	31	1	11th	Did not enter	(Puerto Rico)		(Puerto Rico)
2017	1st	-							-	-	Did not enter	(Puerto Rico)	-	(Puerto Rico)
Season	LPR Pro									Playoffs	CFU Club Championship	Top goalscorer		Managers
Season	Div.	Pos.	Pl.	W	D	L	GS	GA	P	Playoffs	CFU Club Championship	Name	League	Managers
2019-20		11th	15	3	3	9	28	51	12	DNQ	Did not enter	(Puerto Rico)	-	(Puerto Rico)
2020-21	Season Cancelled due to COVID-19													(Puerto Rico)
2021		4th	6	2	2	2	19	14	8	Semi-finals	Did not enter	(Puerto Rico)	-	(Puerto Rico)
2022		4th	14	9	0	5	43	19	27	Semi-finals	Did not enter	(Puerto Rico)	-	(Puerto Rico)
2022-23	Apertura	4th	8	2	1	5	16	18	7	Semi-finals	Did not enter	(Puerto Rico)	-	(Puerto Rico) José Coss
2022-23	Clausura	2nd	5	2	2	1	12	6	8	2nd	Did not enter	(Puerto Rico)	-	(Puerto Rico) José Coss
2023-24	Apertura	2nd	7	6	0	1			18	1st	Group stage	(Puerto Rico) Marc Nieves	8	(Puerto Rico) Daniel Galindo
2023-24	Clausura	1st	7	6	1	0	20	3	19	1st	Group stage	(Puerto Rico) Kevin Hernández	10	(Puerto Rico) Daniel Galindo
2024-25	Apertura	1st	9	8	1	0	58	3	25	1st	Did not enter	(Puerto Rico) Kevin Hernández	12	(Puerto Rico) Daniel Galindo
2024-25	Clausura	2nd	18	15	3	0	67	15	48	Cancelled	Did not enter	(Puerto Rico) Kevin Hernández	23	(Puerto Rico) Daniel Galindo
2025-26	Apertura	3rd	18	13	3	2	88	27	42	1st	Qualified	(Puerto Rico) Kevin Torres	17	(Puerto Rico) Javier Torres
2025-26	Clausura	1st	20	17	2	1	85	10	53	2nd	Qualified	(Puerto Rico) Kevin Torres	27	(Puerto Rico) Javier Torres
2026-27	Apertura	-							-	-	To be decided.	(Puerto Rico)	-	(Puerto Rico) Elismael Ortiz
2026-27	Clausura	-	-	-	-	-	-	-	-	-	To be decided.	(Puerto Rico)	-	(Puerto Rico) Elismael Ortiz

== Achievements ==
- Torneo Nacional Superior

Winners (13): 1975, 1978, 1981, 1984, 1986, 1988, 1989, 1995–96, 1996–97, 1997–98, 1999–2000, 2000–01, 2001–02
Runners-up (1): 1998–99

- Liga Mayor de Fútbol Nacional

Winners (1): 2005

- Campeonato Nacional de Fútbol de Puerto Rico

Runners-up (1): 2006

- Liga Metropolitana Futbol de Puerto Rico

Winners (1): 2008

- Puerto Rico Soccer League

Runners-up (1): 2014 (Copa Criolla), 2015

- Liga Puerto Rico

Winners (4): 2023–24 Apertura, 2023–24 Clausura, 2024–25 Apertura, 2025–26 Apertura
Runners-up (1): 2022–23 Clausura, 2024–25 Clausura

== Club hierarchy ==
Puerto Rico Soccer League
Season	Position
2008–09	5th
2009–10	6th

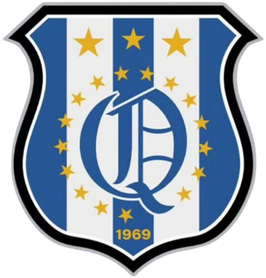
Logo with three stars.

Academia Quintana Ltd.

Chairman: Benjamín Martínez

Academia Quintana plc.

Vice President : Norman Morales

Club treasure : José Barreda

Club Secretary : Francisco Castellano

=== Manager History ===
- José Coss ( July 2022 - unknown)
- Daniel Galindo (July 2023 - unknown)
- Javier Torres (September 2025 - July 2026)
- Elismael Ortiz (Aug. 2026 - present)

=== Stadium history ===
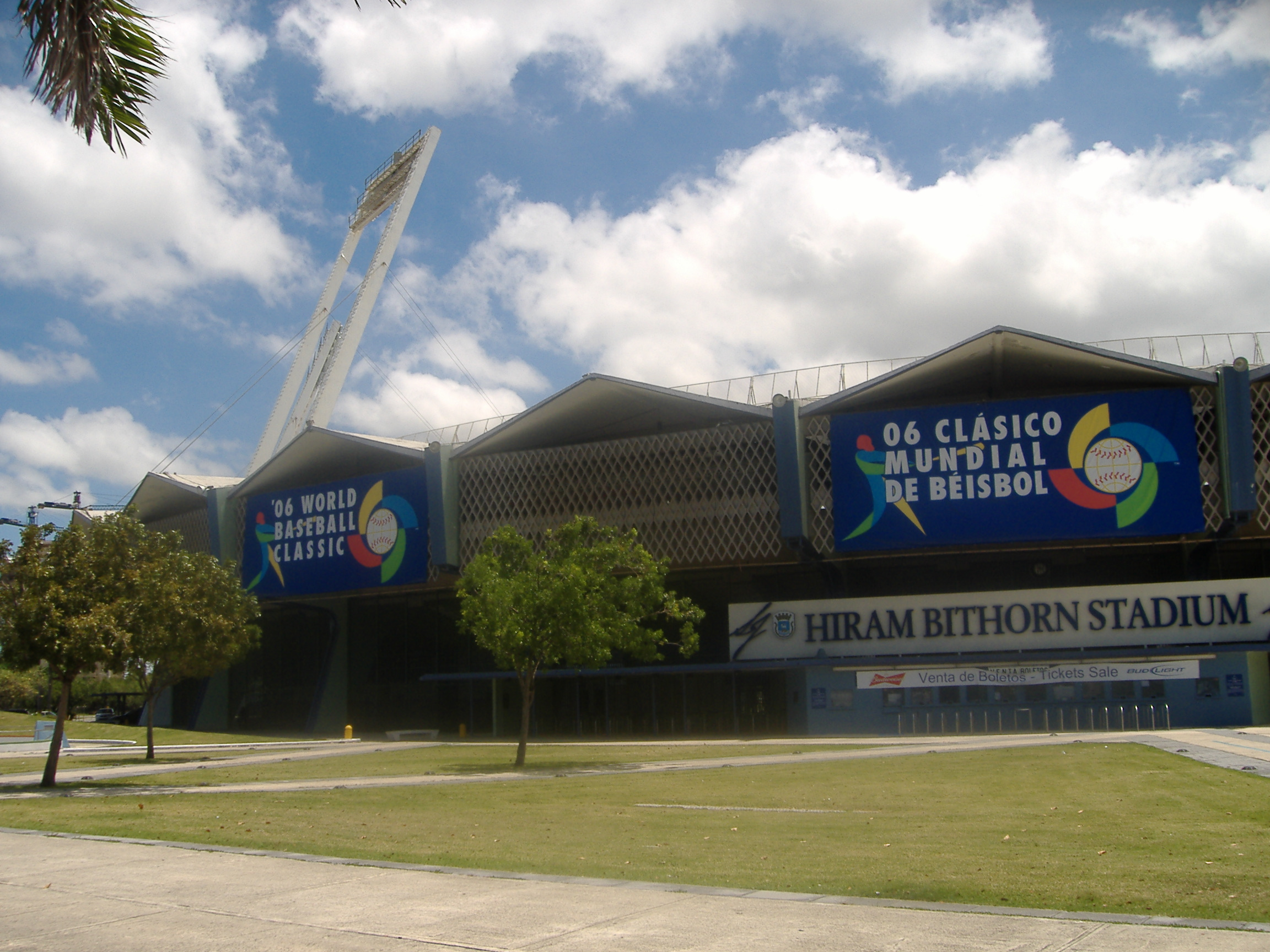
The stadium's front entrance

The team began playing in Hiran Bithorn Stadium, sharing it with Atléticos de San Juan.

The team now plays in a stadium called "Estadio Benjamín Martínez" named after the chairman of the team.
