= Karlos Ferrer =

Puerto Rican soccer player

Personal information
- Full name: Karlos Ferrer Mojica
- Date of birth: January 28, 1998 (age 28)
- Place of birth: San Juan, Puerto Rico
- Height: 1.75 m (5 ft 9 in)
- Position: Midfielder

Team information
- Current team: Metropolitan FA
- Number: 9

Youth career
- 2011: CD Barbosa
- 2012–2015: Don Bosco FC

Senior career*
Years	Team	Apps	(Gls)
2016–	Metropolitan FA	23	(29)

International career^{‡}
2013	Puerto Rico U15		
2016–2018	Puerto Rico	3	(0)
- * Club domestic league appearances and goals as of 4:30, 30 December 2016 (UTC) ‡ National team caps and goals as of 4:30, 30 December 2016 (UTC)

Karlos Ferrer Mojica (born January 28, 1998) is a Puerto Rican professional footballer who plays as a midfielder for LPR club Metropolitan FA.

== Early life ==
In 2011, Karlos Ferrer played for the CD Barbosa youth team, and in the 2011 season he was chosen as MVP.

== Club career ==
On July 28, 2016, Ferrer was one of five youths practicing football to have been awarded the first Lyon Scholarship for sporting and academic excellence. Ferrer excelled with the Metropolitan FA during the past season of the Puerto Rico Soccer League.

Ferrer became the all-time top scorer in the Puerto Rico Soccer League (PRSL) with 29 goals scored in a single season with the Metropolitan FA.

On January 19, 2017, Ferrer was selected as Player of the Year by FutbolBoricua at their 4th annual FBNET Awards.

== International career ==
On June 11, 2013, Ferrer was chosen to participate in the CONCACAF tournament in the Cayman Islands with the Puerto Rico U-15 soccer team.

Ferrer's latest national senior team call-up was when he made an appearance against India on September 3, 2016.

== Honours ==
=== Club ===
Metropolitan FA

- Puerto Rico Soccer League: 2016

=== Individual ===
Puerto Rico Soccer League

- FBNET Player of the Year: 2016
