= Atléticos de Levittown FC =

Puerto Rican association football club

Club Atlético Levittown
- Full name: Club Atlético de Levittown
- Nickname: C.A.L.
- Founded: 1989; 37 years ago
- Stadium: Pista de Levittown
- Chairman: Fernando Montiveros
- League: Puerto Rico Soccer League

Club Atlético de Levittown is a Puerto Rican football club which played in the now defunct Campeonato Nacional de Fútbol de Puerto Rico. Now the team plays in the Puerto Rico Soccer League first division. They now have a new ground in Levittown called Pista de Levittown where they played their first soccer game vs. Criollos, which they won 1-0.
