= 2022 Liga Puerto Rico season =

Liga Puerto Rico
- Season: March 12 2022 - July 9, 2022
- Champions: Metropolitan FA (2nd title)

The 2022 Liga Puerto Rico season was the third season of the Liga Puerto Rico, the top tier soccer league on the island. Bayamon FC were the reigning champions because of their 2021 Liga Puerto Rico season championship in the previous season.

Metropolitan FA were crowned champions.

== Standings ==
League Standings at the end of the season.

	Team	GP	W	D	L	GF	GA	GD	Pts.
1	Metropolitan FA	14	10	3	1	51	16	+35	33
2	Bayamon FC	14	9	2	3	49	11	+38	29
3	Puerto Rico Sol FC	14	8	4	2	31	15	+16	28
4	Academia Quintana	14	9	0	5	43	19	+24	27
5	CF Fraigcomar	14	7	2	5	42	28	+14	23
6	Guaynabo Gol SC	14	5	0	9	22	30	-8	15
7	Caguas Sporting FC	14	1	2	11	11	67	-56	5
8	FC Mayagüez	14	0	1	13	3	66	-63	1

Team Changes
▲ Joining	▼ Leaving
FC Mayagüez	None

== Playoffs ==
=== Semi-Finals ===
July 3, 2022
16:30 EST (UTC−5)

Metropolitan FA	8–1	Academia Quintana
	Recap

Estadio CentroAmericano, Mayagüez
Referee: - (Puerto Rico)
July 3, 2022
19:30 EST (UTC−5)

Bayamon FC	1–1 (a.e.t.)	Puerto Rico Sol FC

Estadio CentroAmericano, Mayagüez
Referee: - (Puerto Rico)

=== Championship ===
July 9, 2022
16:30 EST (UTC−5)

Metropolitan FA	5–0	Puerto Rico Sol FC
Julian 15'; Francisco 22'; 56'; 56'; Martinez 78' (pen.)

Estadio Juan Ramón Loubriel, Bayamón
Referee: - (Puerto Rico)

Video Feed:

LPR Champions
Metropolitan FA
2nd title
Livestream
