= Vega Baja FC =

Puerto Rican association football club

- Full name: Vega Baja Fútbol Club
- Nickname: Fénix FC
- Founded: 2001; 25 years ago
- Ground: Cancha de Vega Baja; Vega Baja, Puerto Rico
- Capacity: 5,000
- Head coach: Pedro Armstrong
- League: Puerto Rico Soccer League
Home colours	Away colours	Third colours

Vega Baja Fútbol Club also known as Fénix FC is a Puerto Rican professional football club from Vega Baja that plays in the Puerto Rico Soccer League.

== History ==
Vega Baja FC was founded in 2001 in the town of Vega Baja and spent its first years in the Second Division as an amateur team until, for the 2014 season, it became a professional team in order to play in the Puerto Rico Soccer League , finishing in eleventh place in its first season.

== Current squad ==
Note: Flags indicate national team as defined under FIFA eligibility rules; some limited exceptions apply. Players may hold more than one non-FIFA nationality.

No. / Pos. / Nation / Player; — / FW / PUR	No. / Pos. / Nation / Player
