= Parque de Fútbol San Juan Bosco =

Football stadium in San Juan, Puerto Rico

- Interactive map of Parque de Fútbol San Juan Bosco
- Location: San Juan, Puerto Rico
- Coordinates: 18.4313°N 66.0404°W
- Capacity: 1,000
- Surface: Grass

Tenant
- Don Bosco FC

The Parque de Fútbol San Juan Bosco is a 1,000-seat association football stadium in San Juan, Puerto Rico. As of the 2018-19 Liga Puerto Rico season, it hosts the home matches of Don Bosco FC.
