= Leal Arecibo FC =

Association football club in Puerto Rico

- Full name: Leal Arecibo Fútbol Club
- Founded: 2006; 20 years ago
- Ground: UPR Arecibo; Arecibo, Puerto Rico
- Manager: Antonio Lopez
- League: Liga Puerto Rico
- 2019/20: Abandoned
- Website: https://www.facebook.com/lealarecibo.fc

Leal Arecibo Fútbol Club is a Puerto Rican association football club from Arecibo that currently plays in the Liga Puerto Rico. It plays its home matches on the campus of the University of Puerto Rico at Arecibo.

== History ==
Leal Arecibo FC was founded in 2006. It joined the nascent Liga Puerto Rico for the 2019/20 season which was eventually cancelled because of the COVID-19 pandemic.

== Domestic history ==
Key

Champion Runners-up 3rd Place

Season	League							Domestic Cup	Notes
Season	Div.	Pos.	Pl.	W	D	L	P	Domestic Cup	Notes
2019/20	1st	N/A	16	6	1	9	19		Season abandoned because of COVID-19 pandemic

=== Year-by-year ===
Season	PRSL									Playoffs	CFU Club Championship	Top goalscorer		Managers
Season	Div.	Pos.	Pl.	W	D	L	GS	GA	P	Playoffs	CFU Club Championship	Name	League	Managers
2015	1st	9th	10	2	3	5	13	16	9	DNQ	Did not enter	(Puerto Rico)	-	(Puerto Rico)
2016	Apertura	9th	13	6	1	6	34	25	19	DNQ	Did not enter	(Puerto Rico)		(Puerto Rico)
2016	Clausura	5th	10	5	1	4	25	18	16	DNQ	Did not enter	(Puerto Rico)		(Puerto Rico)
Season	LPR Pro									Playoffs	CFU Club Championship	Top goalscorer		Managers
Season	Div.	Pos.	Pl.	W	D	L	GS	GA	P	Playoffs	CFU Club Championship	Name	League	Managers
2019-20	1st	8th	16	6	1	9	41	33	19	DNQ	Did not enter	(Puerto Rico) Alejandro Lopez	13	(Puerto Rico)
2020-21	Season Cancelled due to COVID-19													
