= Liga Mayor de Fútbol Nacional =

Defunct Puerto Rican football league (1996-2005)

- Founded: 1996; 30 years ago
- Folded: 2005; 21 years ago
- Country: Puerto Rico
- Confederation: CONCACAF

Liga Mayor de Fútbol Nacional, known more commonly as just Liga Mayor, was an association football league in Puerto Rico, founded in 1996 replacing the Torneo Nacional Superior, and folding in 2005. It was one of the two amateur leagues in Puerto Rico played during the late 1990s and early 2000s.

In 2005, the league folded as the Puerto Rican Football Federation unified the domestic football scene in the territory to form the Campeonato Nacional de Fútbol.

== Champions ==
- 1997 - Leones
- 1998 - Islanders
- 1999 - Islanders
- 2000 - Vaqueros
- 2001 - Islanders
- 2002 - Vaqueros
- 2003 - Sporting
- 2004 - Sporting
- 2005 - Real Quintana
