= Liga Puerto Rico Pro =

Puerto Rican association football league

- Organizing body: Puerto Rican Football Federation
- Founded: 2018; 8 years ago
- Country: Puerto Rico
- Confederation: CONCACAF
- President: Jorge Ferro
- Number of clubs: 9
- Level on pyramid: 1
- Domestic cup: Supercopa LPR PRO
- International cup: CFU Club Shield
- Current champion(s): Apertura: Academia Quintana (4th title); Clausura: Ponce FC (1st title)
- Most championships: Metropolitan FA (5 titles)
- Top scorer: Kevin Hernández (90 goals)
- Broadcasters: Live Streaming; YouTube: Liga Puerto Rico Pro
- Website: ligapuertorico.com
- Current: 2026–27 Apertura

The Liga Puerto Rico Pro (LPR PRO) is the top-flight association football league of Puerto Rico. The league is organized by the Puerto Rican Football Federation.

In 2025, The league champions of each tournament (Apertura/Clausura) particitpate in the LPR Supercopa to determine who qualifies to participate in the Caribbean Club Shield each season.

== History ==
Motto: La Liga De Aquí

Following the absence of a league in Puerto Rico for the 2017-18 season, the new Liga Puerto Rico was announced via Facebook by the Puerto Rico Football Federation in August 2018. Prior to the announcement, the federation organized a preparatory tournament that ran from March until June 2018. Ten teams participated in the tournament which was eventually won by Bayamón FC. The league's official launch event attended by FIFA and CONCACAF delegates was held on August 23, 2018 with the league set to begin play the following month.

The first season began on September 29 with 8 teams, who played a double round-robin tournament totaling 14 matches. At the end of the season, the top 6 teams advanced to the next stage; the top 2 teams qualified for the semifinals and the top 4 for the quarterfinals. The champion of the quarterfinals then qualified for the CFU Club Championship. It saw Metropolitan FA beat Bayamón Fútbol Club in the championship match. The match went to penalty kicks which Metropolitan won 4–1 after a 0–0 draw in regulation time.

The second season of the league began but was abandoned because of the COVID-19 pandemic. The league did not name a champion.

Prior to the 2020–21 season the league unveiled a new championship trophy designed by local artist Milton G. Rodriguez. A replica of the trophy, which is almost three feet tall and over one and a half feet wide, will be given to the champions each season while the original will remain with the Puerto Rican Football Federation.

In 2025, the league was renamed as the Liga Puerto Rico Pro by the Puerto Rican Football Federation.

=== Game Balls ===
- 25-26 : Givova Match New Maya
- 26-27 : Oqiqo Boricua

== Competition ==
Like much of Latin America, Liga Puerto Rico is split into an Apertura and Clausura. Due to the instability of the league, often teams will participate in one half of the season but not the other. Each phase of the season teams play each other twice. After a playoff phase the winner qualifies for the CFU Club Shield.

The league does not enforce a strict numerical cap on foreign-born players in club rosters, and players from the United States are classified as domestic.

The league also does not have a promotion and relegation system.

== Clubs ==
Locations of the current 2026 Apertura Season of Liga Puerto Rico Pro clubs

=== Current clubs ===
A total of nine clubs currently compete in the 2026 Apertura season of Liga Puerto Rico Pro.

Team	City	Stadium	Capacity	Founded	Joined	Head Coach
Academia Quintana	San Juan	Estadio Benjamín Martínez González	1,500	1969	2019	(Puerto Rico) Elismael Ortiz
Caguas Sporting FC	Caguas	Parque Villa del Rey	1,200	2016	2018	(Puerto Rico) Fernando Reyes
Metropolitan FA	San Juan	Parque Reparto Metropolitano	1,000	2012	2018	(Argentina) Jorge Silveti
Puerto Rico Surf SC	Guaynabo	Complejo Deportivo Torrimar	1,000	2020	2024	(Puerto Rico) Javier Torres
EF Taurinos de Cayey	Cayey	Estadio Angel Luis Correa	1,000	2004	2024	(Puerto Rico) Rafael Ramos
San Juan FC	San Juan	Estadio Sixto Escobar	1,000	2011	2024	(Puerto Rico) Daniel Galindo
DS Edusoccer	Mayagüez	Estadio Centroamericano de Mayagüez	12,175	2016	2024	(Venezuela) Julio Cesar Infante
Ponce FC	Ponce	Los Caobos	1,000	2025	2025	(Mexico) David Martinez
Guaynabo FC	Guaynabo	Guaynabo FC Soccer Field	1,000	2023	2026	(Argentina) (Puerto Rico) Sebastián Uranga

=== Former clubs ===
Team	City	Stadium	Capacity	Founded	Joined	Left
GPS Puerto Rico	Guaynabo	Pista Atlética de Torrimar	1,000	2015	2019	2019
Ramey SC	Aguadilla	Pista Atlética Ana Beltrán	1,000	2004	2018	2020
Club de Balompie Junqueño	Juncos	Parque de Fútbol Colegio Corazón de María	1,000	2004	2019	2020
Leal Arecibo FC	Arecibo	UPR Arecibo	1,000	2006	2019	2020
Mirabelli SA	Carolina	Parque de Fútbol Colegio Corazón de María	1,000	2010	2018	2020
Guaynabo Gol SC	Guaynabo	Estadio Charlie Fuentes	1,000	2007	2018	2023
Bayamón Fútbol Club	Bayamón	Bayamón Soccer Complex	1,000	1999	2018	2024
Puerto Rico Sol FC	Mayagüez	Mayagüez Athletics Stadium	12,175	2016	2018	2024
Don Bosco FC	San Juan	Parque de Fútbol San Juan Bosco	1,000	1952	2018	2024
Club de Fútbol Fraigcomar	San Juan	Estadio San Francisco	2,000	1986	2021	2024
MK Elite SA	San Juan	Estadio de Fútbol Edwin Pérez Caraballo	1,000	2020	2024	2025
Caribe Soccer Club	Ponce	Parque Emilio Fagot	100	2003	2024	2025
Guayama FC	Guayama	Estadio Municipal Dr. Roberto Monroig Pérez	1,500	1959	2023	2026
FC Mayagüez	Mayagüez	Mayagüez Athletics Stadium	12,175	2003	2018	2026

- Guaynabo Gol SC rebranded as Guaynabo FC.
- GPS Puerto Rico merged with Puerto Rico Surf SC.

== Champions ==
Logo of Liga Puerto Rico – the competition's name from 2018 to 2025.

Below is a list of Liga Puerto Rico Pro champions and runners-up.

Teams that no longer participate in the LPR Pro are in italics.

Season	Champions	Runners-up	Ref.
Liga Puerto Rico
2018–19	Metropolitan FA (1)	Bayamon FC	
2019–20	Canceled due to the COVID-19 pandemic in Puerto Rico		
2020–21	Canceled due to the COVID-19 pandemic in Puerto Rico		
2021	Bayamon FC (1)	Metropolitan FA	
2022	Metropolitan FA (2)	Puerto Rico Sol	
2022 Apertura	Metropolitan FA (3)	Puerto Rico Sol	
2023 Clausura	Metropolitan FA (4)	Academia Quintana	
2023 Apertura	Academia Quintana (1)	Metropolitan FA	
2024 Clausura	Academia Quintana (2)	Metropolitan FA	
2024 Apertura	Academia Quintana (3)	Metropolitan FA	
Liga Puerto Rico Pro
2025 Clausura	Metropolitan FA (5)	Academia Quintana	
2025 Apertura	Academia Quintana (4)	Puerto Rico Surf SC	
2026 Clausura	Ponce FC (1)	Academia Quintana	

=== Championships by team ===
Club	Titles	Runners-up
Metropolitan FA	5	4
Academia Quintana	4	3
Bayamón FC	1	1
Ponce FC	1	—
Puerto Rico Sol	—	2
Puerto Rico Surf SC	—	1

=== Supercopa LPR PRO ===
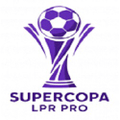
Logo used since 24-25 season for the SuperCopa in Puerto Rico.

CFU Club Shield Qualifier
Season	Apertura Winner	Clausura Winner	Game Date	Location	SuperCopa Winner	Result
2024–25	Academia Quintana	Metropolitan FA	November 19, 2025	Ponce, Puerto Rico	Metropolitan FA	3—0
2025–26	Academia Quintana	Ponce FC	November 4, 2026	Mayagüez, Puerto Rico	Academia Quintana	2—0

== International competition ==
The following is a list of results for Liga Puerto Rico clubs in international competitions. LPR club scores are listed first.

Year	Club	Tournament	Round	Opponent	Home	Away	Agg.
2020	Metropolitan	Caribbean Club Shield	Group stage				
2020	Metropolitan	Caribbean Club Shield	Group stage	Santiago de Cuba	Cancelled		
2020	Metropolitan	Caribbean Club Shield	Group stage	(Cayman Islands) Scholars International	Cancelled		
2020	Metropolitan	Caribbean Club Shield	Group stage	(Suriname) Inter Moengotapoe	Cancelled		
2021	Metropolitan	Caribbean Club Championship	Group stage	(Dominican Republic) Delfines del Este	3–0		
2021	Metropolitan	Caribbean Club Championship	Group stage	(Bonaire) Real Rincon	4–0		
2021	Metropolitan	Caribbean Club Championship	Semi-finals	(Suriname) Inter Moengotapoe	1–3		
2021	Metropolitan	CONCACAF League	Preliminary round	(Guatemala) Santa Lucía	0–3	1–2	1–5
2022	Bayamón	Caribbean Club Shield	Group stage	(Collectivity of Saint Martin) Junior Stars	3–3		
2022	Bayamón	Caribbean Club Shield	Group stage	(Dominica) South East	6–0		
2022	Bayamón	Caribbean Club Shield	Semi-final	(Curaçao) Jong Holland	2–1		
2022	Bayamón	Caribbean Club Shield	Final	(Suriname) Inter Moengotapoe	2–1		
2022	Bayamón	Caribbean Club Championship	CONCACAF League playoff	(Jamaica) Waterhouse	0–4		
2023	Metropolitan	Caribbean Club Shield	Group stage	(Saint Kitts and Nevis) St. Paul's United	2–0		
2023	Metropolitan	Caribbean Club Shield	Group stage	(Collectivity of Saint Martin) Junior Stars	3–0		
2023	Metropolitan	Caribbean Club Shield	Group stage	(Curaçao) Jong Holland	2–0		
2023	Metropolitan	Caribbean Club Shield	Semi-final	(Suriname) Robinhood	0–5		
2023	Metropolitan	Caribbean Club Shield	Third place match	(Trinidad and Tobago) Club Sando	1–6		
2024	Metropolitan	Caribbean Club Shield	Round of 16	(Turks and Caicos Islands) SWA Sharks FC	2–0		
2024	Metropolitan	Caribbean Club Shield	Quarter-finals	(Dominican Republic) Atlético Pantoja	0–1		
2025	Academia Quintana	Caribbean Club Shield	Group Stage	(United States Virgin Islands) Rovers SC	5–0		
2025	Academia Quintana	Caribbean Club Shield	Group Stage	(Bonaire) Real Rincon	3–0		
2026	Metropolitan	Caribbean Club Shield	Round of 16	(Saint Vincent and the Grenadines) North Leeward Predators FC	4–0		
2026	Metropolitan	Caribbean Club Shield	Quarter-finals	(United States Virgin Islands) Helenites SC	2–1		
2026	Metropolitan	Caribbean Club Shield	Semi-final	(Dominican Republic) Delfines del Este FC	0–0, 9-10 PK		

== Gallery ==
Past logos of Liga Puerto Rico

First logo of the league, used in 2018.

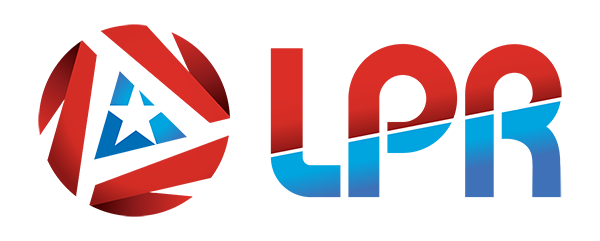
Second logo of the league, used from 2018-2025.

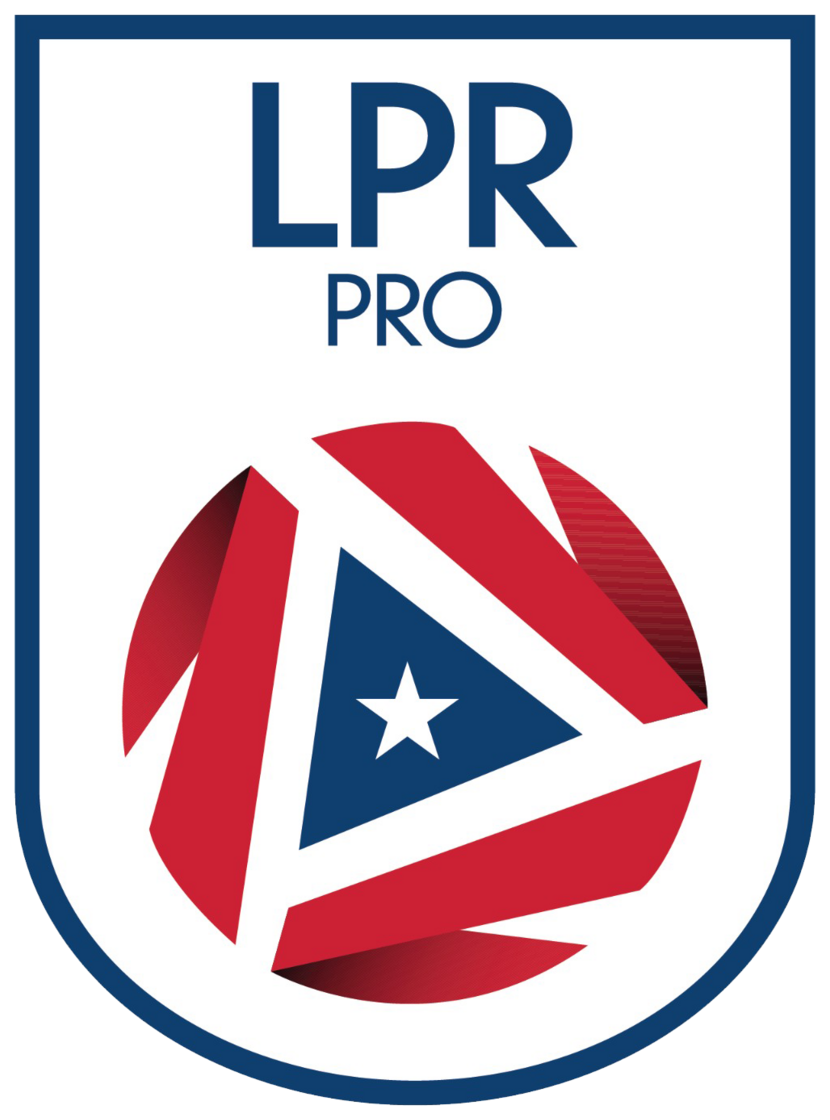
Third logo of the league, introduced in 2025.

LPR Men's Divison typeface, still being used on FPF website.

An updated look to the symbol of the league introduced in 2025.

== Footnotes ==
1. GPS Puerto Rico began playing in the league in 2018 but merged with the newly formed Puerto Rico Surf SC in July 2020.
2. Guaynabo Gol SC began playing in the league in 2018 but reorganized and rebranded to become Guaynabo FC in 2023.
3. As the most recent Puerto Rico champions, Metropolitan FA were automatically entered into the expanded 2021 Caribbean Club Championship after the 2021 Caribbean Club Shield was cancelled because of a COVID-19 breakout in Curaçao.

== See also ==
- List of Puerto Rican football champions
- List of top Liga Puerto Rico Pro goal scorers by season
