= Don Bosco FC (Puerto Rico) =

Puerto Rican soccer team based in San Juan, Puerto Rico

- Full name: Don Bosco Fútbol Club
- Founded: 1952; 74 years ago
- Stadium: Parque de Fútbol San Juan Bosco; San Juan, Puerto Rico
- Capacity: 1,000
- Owner(s): Alistair Osorio & Grant Bermúdez
- Chairman: Alistair Osorio
- Manager: Carlos Antonio Balbuena Munoz
- Coach: Terrence Piñero
- League: Liga Puerto Rico
- 2023 Apertura: Regular Season: 8th
- Website: donboscofc.com
colors	colors

Don Bosco FC is a historic Puerto Rican association football club based in the Cantera community of San Juan, Puerto Rico. The club used to play in the Liga Puerto Rico, and plays their home matches at the Parque de Fútbol San Juan Bosco.

== History ==
The club was founded in San Juan in 1952 named after Giovanni Melchiorre Bosco, better known as John Bosco or Don Bosco. Don Bosco FC won their first trophy in 1963 and went on to win two consecutive league titles in 1969 and 1970. Their most recent title win in the annual Puerto Rican football championship came in 1994. In 2016, they competed in the inaugural Copa Luis Villarejo. Losing in the first round to Criollos de Caguas FC with an aggregate of 2–14.

On February 26, Don Bosco beat GPS Puerto Rico 2–1 to win the 2017 Don Bosco Cup preseason tournament with Luis Jordán scoring on a penalty and Alexander Cruz scoring late in the game to finish it.

In the newly formed Liga Puerto Rico, the club finished third in the 2018-19 regular season with three points, qualifying for the quarterfinals of the championship playoffs. After a 2–4 away defeat against Guaynabo Gol SC, the team reversed the series with a 4–1 home win to reach the semifinals. There, they defeated Bayamón FC 4–3 in the second leg, but could not reach the final due to a heavy 2–6 defeat in the first leg. Don Bosco FC was also eliminated in the Copa Luis Villarejo semifinals by the same team.

== Current squad ==
Note: Flags indicate national team as defined under FIFA eligibility rules; some limited exceptions apply. Players may hold more than one non-FIFA nationality.

No.	Pos.	Nation	Player
—	GK	PUR	Christopher Echevarría
—	DF	PUR	Luis Lorenzo
—	MF	PUR	Alexander Cruz
—	DF	PUR	Benito Ocasio
—	DF	USA	Eason Price
—	DF	PUR	Jose Pep
—	MF	PUR	Luis Jordan

No.	Pos.	Nation	Player
—	FW	PUR	Dennis Beltres
—	MF	PUR	Jorge Marin
—	FW	ARG	Andrés Arce
—	FW	PUR	Carbnaldo Jr.
—	FW	AUS	Jordein Mhukradam
—	FW	USA	Joshua White
—	FW	EGY	Daveed Sanaldinho

== Year-by-year ==
Season	PRSL									Overall	CFU Club Championship	Top goalscorer		Managers
Season	Div.	Pos.	Pl.	W	D	L	GS	GA	P	Overall	CFU Club Championship	Name	League	Managers
2015		6th	10	3	3	4	23	21	12	6th	Did not enter	(Puerto Rico)		(Puerto Rico)
2016	Apertura	10th	13	4	3	6	27	35	15	8th	Did not enter	(Puerto Rico)		(Puerto Rico)
2016	Clausura	7th	10	4	2	4	30	27	14	8th	Did not enter	(Puerto Rico)		(Puerto Rico)
Season	LPR Pro									Playoffs	CFU Club Championship	Top goalscorer		Managers
Season	Div.	Pos.	Pl.	W	D	L	GS	GA	P	Playoffs	CFU Club Championship	Name	League	Managers
2018-19	1st	3rd	21	10	5	6	54	38	35	Semi-finals	Did not enter	(Puerto Rico) Dennis Beltré	22	(Puerto Rico)
2019-20	1st	6th	15	8	2	5	37	34	26	Cancelled	Did not enter	(Puerto Rico) Dennis Beltré	15	(Puerto Rico)
2020-21	Season Cancelled due to COVID-19													(Puerto Rico)
2021	Went On Hiatus										Did not enter	(Puerto Rico)	-	(Puerto Rico)
2022	Went On Hiatus										Did not enter	(Puerto Rico)	-	(Puerto Rico)
2022-23	Apertura	Went On Hiatus									Did not enter	(Puerto Rico)	-	(Puerto Rico)
2022-23	Clausura	4th	5	2	1	2	5	6	6	Semi-finals	Did not enter	(Puerto Rico)	-	(Puerto Rico)
2023-24	Apertura	8th	7	0	2	5			2	DNQ	Did not enter	(Puerto Rico) Jorge Rivera	5	(Puerto Rico)
2023-24	Clausura	Went On Hiatus									Did not enter	(Puerto Rico) Jorge Rivera	5	(Puerto Rico)

== Achievements ==
=== Domestic ===
Don Bosco Cup

- Champions: 2017
