= Puerto Rico Soccer League =

Association football league in Puerto Rico (2008–2017)

- Founded: 2008; 18 years ago
- Folded: 2017; 9 years ago
- Country: Puerto Rico
- Confederation: CONCACAF
- Number of clubs: 14
- Level on pyramid: 1
- Relegation to: None
- Domestic cup(s): Cup of Excellence; Luis Villarejo Cup
- International cup(s): CFU Club Championship; CONCACAF Champions League
- Last champions: GPS Puerto Rico (1st title)
- Most championships: Sevilla FC Puerto Rico; Bayamón FC; FC Leones de Ponce; Criollos de Caguas FC; Metropolitan Football Academy; GPS Puerto Rico (1 title each)
- Broadcaster: FBNET
- Website: prslprosoccer.com

The Puerto Rico Soccer League or PRSL was an association football league in Puerto Rico, being founded in 2008. It was the first professional football league in the island's history.

Association football had been growing in popularity in recent years, and this was an attempt to further develop the game on the island. The previous highest league in the territory was the Campeonato Nacional de Fútbol de Puerto Rico. It shared Division I status with Liga Nacional de Fútbol de Puerto Rico.

== History ==
The league was founded in 2008 starting with 8 teams. The first president of the league was Mike Roca. Over the past few years football has grown throughout the island and is among the top sports in Puerto Rico, behind baseball, basketball, boxing, and volleyball.

In 2009, FIFA donated $150,000 to Puerto Rico through the "Win with CONCACAF" program. The donations would most likely go to building more capable stadiums, and other such necessities. The winner of the League got a bid to play in the CFU Club Championship, which serves as the qualifying tournament for the CONCACAF Champions League.

The league was hoping to develop a Second Division to start relegation and promotion by the 2011–2012 season. The federation's president also said they would eventually create a Third Division for amateurs and a Fourth Division for U-17 teams. The Second Division was called Liga Nacional de Futbol de Puerto Rico. In 2009 the Second Division changed from the 2008 season and officially became a league with 16 teams. The league was split into 2 groups of 8 teams. In 2010, the league expanded to 21 teams.

Some of the member clubs are affiliated to larger clubs in more established football leagues around the globe. Some teams in the league received promotions from several international clubs, including Club Atlético River Plate, Club de Fútbol Pachuca, Fluminense Football Club, and Sevilla Fútbol Club. The only team which name did not reflect the promotion was the CF Tornados de Humacao, affiliated to Club de Fútbol Pachuca.

=== Early years ===
The league was created on May 14, 2008, and held its first season the same year from June until October with a total of 56 games being played. The inaugural season featured eight teams, and both the regular season and the playoffs were won by the same team Sevilla Fútbol Club Puerto Rico; beating CA River Plate Puerto Rico with a score of 2–1. By winning the championship, Sevilla FC Puerto Rico also qualified to the 2009 CFU Club Championship, joining the seeded Puerto Rico Islanders Football Club. For the 2009 season the league wanted to put in place an "Apertura" and "Clausura" system like the one used in Argentina and Mexico with the Apertura playing from September to December, while the Clausura would play from January to April. However, the league has never implemented the system for a future season.

The expansion team for the 2009 season was Bayamón Football Club when Sevilla FC Bayamón moved from Bayamón to Juncos becoming the Sevilla FC Juncos or Sevilla FC Puerto Rico. The Gigantes de Carolina FC became affiliated with Club Atlético Boca Juniors and became the Boca Juniors Carolina FC.

This season saw the introduction of a home leg and an away leg in the playoffs, with the winner of the aggregate advancing to the final, which also consisted of a two legs format. The first game of the season was played on May 21, 2009, in Juncos, Puerto Rico, between Bayamón FC and defending champions Sevilla FC Puerto Rico, Sevilla won the first match in the new rivalry by winning 1–0. CA River Plate Puerto Rico won the regular season and secured the top seed for the playoffs. The champions of the playoffs was Bayamón FC, winning the aggregate with a score of 3–2 over Atlético de San Juan Football Club. Both, the regular season champion, CA River Plate Puerto Rico, and the playoffs champion, Bayamón FC, qualified for the 2010 CFU Club Championship, joining the seeded Puerto Rico Islanders FC.

=== 2010-2012 ===
There were plans to celebrate the 2010–2011 season with the Apertura and Clausura schedule system. However, due to economic problems and other factors, the league recessed in 2010. Only to schedule a small tournament called "Supercopa DirecTV 2010" which would serve as the qualifier for the CFU Club Championship. Eight teams participated in the tournament, including three new expansion teams (Mayagüez Football Club, Fajardo Football Club and Puerto Rico United Sporting Club) and incorporating the Puerto Rico Islanders FC to the PRSL for the first time. The two finalists of the tournament, CA River Plate Puerto Rico and Puerto Rico Islanders FC, qualified for the 2011 CFU Club Championship.

The 2011 season ran from April to July with only six teams, three of which (Sevilla FC Puerto Rico, CA River Plate Puerto Rico and Puerto Rico United SC) participated briefly in the USL Pro Division. This season saw the move of the CA River Plate Puerto Rico, from Ponce to Fajardo, thus losing the unofficial CA River Plate Ponce designation for the equivalent CA River Plate Fajardo . However, waiting for its stadium to be built in Fajardo, the team played in Carolina.

The regular season was won by Sevilla FC Puerto Rico, which became the first team to win two regular season cups. Yet, it was defeated in the Playoff Championship game by the season's expansion team Football Club Leones de Ponce. Both teams qualified to the 2012 CFU Club Championship.

The league notified FIFA and the Puerto Rican Football Federation again of a temporary recess for reorganization and was replaced by the Liga Nacional de Fútbol de Puerto Rico, as the highest active league in the territory for the 2013 season.

=== 2013-2016 ===
On June 4, 2013, the PRSL notified the completion of its reorganization with teams representing the major cities of Puerto Rico and with the involvement of major personalities of the island's sports. It had announced a new "Super Copa" event for the end of 2013 year, and the commencement of a league tournament in April 2014.

In 2015 the league grew to 11 teams, with teams coming from the Liga Nacional.

In 2016, the league played its Apertura tournament with a record 14 teams, with 3 team leaving the league before the start of the Clausura in August 2016.

=== 2017 ===
On January 31, negotiations took place at the headquarters of the Recreation and Sports Department between Puerto Rico's top clubs and the Puerto Rican Football Federation (FPF) to outline the future of men's top football on the island. On February 22, the Puerto Rico Soccer League (PRSL) announced they would be celebrating their 3rd Cup of Excellence with 8 teams participating. The Cup of Excellence would begin between April 28 to 30 and end around June playing a single lap, carnival style, as a cost-saving measure. Caguas Sporting FC, Ballista FC, Mayagüez FC, Bayamón FC, Club Deportivo Barbosa, and defending champions Metropolitan FA would participate. Recently created club Global Premier Soccer GPS Puerto Rico would also be participating as well. On February 23, Club Atlético Fajardo was confirmed to be participating in the Excellence Cup III, becoming the 8th club to participate. On March 1, Fraigcomar SC in the San Francisco neighborhood of San Juan announced it would return to a higher category for the first time since 2007, and would be in the Excellence Cup III as well. On March 29, a week before the cup began, PRSL announced that Academia Quintana had been accepted into the Cup of Excellence.

On September 4, 2017, the Puerto Rico Soccer League (PRSL) announced it would be holding its next tournament in conjunction with the efforts of the Puerto Rican Football Federation (FPF) Competitions Commission which was scheduled to begin in early October 2017. The unification tournament of the Commission of Competitions would be a temporary one for the professional project of first and second division in 2018 according to the new statutes of the FPF.

The Puerto Rico Soccer League (PRSL) and its affiliates held several meetings to re-establish the league's professional tournament in Puerto Rico. It was confirmed that private investment would help the process of re-organization of the league into a professional and inclusive format. The tentative start date of the professional tournament would be September 7, 2018. There were preliminary talks between the PRSL and the FPF on the allocation of the First Official Division and it was expected that the PRSL would make an official presentation to the FPF detailing their plans and other particularities in the face of the challenges for the 2018 season.

=== Folding ===
The league was replaced by Liga Puerto Rico for the 2018 season. The new league was announced via Facebook by the Puerto Rico Football Federation in August 2018. Prior to the announcement, the federation organized a preparatory tournament that ran from March until June 2018. Ten teams participated in the tournament which was eventually won by Bayamón FC. The league's official launch event attended by FIFA and CONCACAF delegates was held on August 23, 2018, with the league set to begin play the following month.

The league had announced it tried restarting the league in 2019 and back again in 2022 via the league LinkedIn page. The league has since been involved in legal cases against the Puerto Rican Federation and FIFA. Puerto Rico Soccer League NFP et al v. Federación Puertorriqueña de Fútbol et al, No. 3:23-cv-01203-RAM.

=== Logo history ===
First used in 2008.

PRSL wordmark

New logo with same name.

Updated logo with new name.

== Teams ==
=== Teams who played in the final season ===
Locations of the 2011 Puerto Rico Soccer League teams
Current locations of teams in the 2017 Puerto Rico Soccer League
Locations of teams that participated in the 2017 PRSL Cup of Excellence.

Club	Home city	Stadium	Capacity	Founded	Joined PRSL
Academia Quintana	San Juan	Hiram Bithorn Stadium	18,000	1969	2008
CA Levittown	Levittown			1989	
Ballista FC	Luquillo	Complejo Deportivo Jose Salaman Estrella	1,000	2016	2016
Bayamon FC B	Bayamón	Estadio Juan Ramón Loubriel	12,500	2009	2009
Caguas Sporting FC	Caguas	Complejo Deportivo Ángel O. Berrios de la Ciudad Criolla	1,200	2016	2016
CD Barbosa	San Juan			1997	
Don Bosco FC	San Juan	Parque de Fútbol San Juan Bosco	1,000	1952	
Fénix FC	Vega Baja	Complejo Deportivo Tortuguero		2001	2014
Mayagüez FC	Mayagüez	Mayagüez Athletics Stadium	12,175	2003	2010
Huracán FC Caguas	Caguas	Yldefonso Solá Morales Stadium		1991	2008
Leal Arecibo FC	Arecibo	UPR Arecibo		2006	2015
Metropolitan FA	San Juan	Estadio Metropolitano del Reparto Metropolitano	1,000	2015	2015
SPDP Spartans	San Juan			2008	2015
Yabuco Isabela FC	Yabucoa			2016	2016

=== Teams which left the league before its final season ===
Club	Home city	Stadium	Founded	Seasons in PRSL
CA River Plate Fajardo	Fajardo^{1}	Roberto Clemente Stadium^{1}	2007	4
Brazilian SA	Arecibo	Poliderpotivo de Arecibo		1
Criollos de Caguas FC	Caguas	Villa del Rey, Caguas	2011	2
Gigantes de Carolina FC	Carolina	Roberto Clemente Stadium	1998	4
CF Tornados de Humacao	Humacao	Estadio Nestor Morales	1994	4
Guaynabo Fluminense FC	Guaynabo	Estadio Jose "Pepito" Bonano	2002	3
Atlético de San Juan	San Juan	Hiram Bithorn Stadium	2008	3
Fajardo FC	Fajardo	Fajardo Soccer Stadium	2010	1
Sevilla FC Juncos	Juncos^{2}	Josué Elevadito González Stadium^{2}	2006	4
Puerto Rico United SC	Aguada	Aguada Stadium	2007	4
Puerto Rico Islanders	Bayamón	Estadio Juan Ramón Loubriel	2003	1
FC Leones de Ponce	Ponce	Francisco "Paquito" Montaner	2011	2

_{^{1} Its first three seasons (2008–2010), the Club Atlético River Plate Puerto Rico played at the Francisco "Paquito" Montaner Stadium in Ponce. In 2011, the team moved to Fajardo, but played in Carolina while its stadium in Fajardo was being built.
^{2} During its first season (2008), the Sevilla Fútbol Club Puerto Rico played at the Estadio Juan Ramón Loubriel in Bayamón. In 2009, the team moved to Juncos and played at the Alfredo "Papo" Alejandro Stadium. The team played at the Josué Elevadito González Stadium, while the Sevilla FC Stadium was being built.}

== League champions and records ==
Results by year
Year	Champions (#) (Playoffs)	Runners-Up (Playoffs)	Leaders (#) (Regular Season)	Top Scorer(s)	Top Scorer's Club	Goals
2008	Sevilla FC Bayamón (1)	CA River Plate Ponce	Sevilla FC Bayamón (1)			
2009	Bayamón FC (1)	Atlético de San Juan FC	CA River Plate Ponce (1)			
2010^{1}	Season did not take place					
2011	FC Leones de Ponce (1)	Sevilla FC Juncos	Sevilla FC Juncos (2)			
2012 ^{2}	Season did not take place					
2013 ^{2}	Season did not take place					
2014	Criollos de Caguas FC (1)	Academia Quintana	Criollos de Caguas FC			
2015 ^{3}	Season did not take place					
2016	Metropolitan FA (1)	Bayamon FC B	Metropolitan FA (1)	Karlos Ferrer Mojica	Metropolitan FA	29
2017	GPS Puerto Rico (1)	Bayamon FC	GPS Puerto Rico (1)			

_{^{1}The league recessed in 2010. Established a tournament called "Supercopa DirecTV 2010" which served as the qualifier for the 2011 CFU Club Championship.}

_{^{2}The league again recessed in 2012, the league reorganized, and became active for the 2014 season.}

_{^{3}The league did not take place in the 2015 season, but then established the PRSL Excellence Cup for teams to compete in.}

=== All-time top scorers ===
All-time top scorers in the Puerto Rico Soccer League (PRSL goals only)
Rank	Player	Goals
1	(Puerto Rico) Karlos Ferrer Mojica	29
2	(Cuba) Julio César Maya Cruz	22
As of December 22, 2016.

The league's all-time top goalscorer was Julio César Maya Cruz until the 2016 season when the young 18 year old star Karlos Ferrer Mojica scored 29 goals in his first season with Metropolitan FA and the league. He was eventually named by FutbolBoricua the 2016 Player of the Year.

== Executive staff ==
League Commissioner: María Larracuente

Director of Operations: Jose Luis Pacheco

=== Past league presidents ===
- Mike Roca (2008–2010)
- Joey Serralta (2011–2013)
- Esteban Rodriguez Estrella (2013–2014)
- Joey Serralta (2016–2018)

== Media coverage ==
Through the inaugural year there was no coverage whatsoever, however after a successful first year the league found themselves being covered on local TV stations WAPA-TV and also on OneLink. The league was also covered by local newspapers such as El Nuevo Dia. Since 2015, the league has had its games broadcast online by FútbolBoricua.net

== See also ==
List of Puerto Rican football champions
Liga Nacional de Fútbol de Puerto Rico
Liga Puerto Rico
