= Criollos de Caguas FC =

Soccer team that plays in the Liga Nacional de Fútbol de Puerto Rico

- Full name: Criollos de Caguas Fútbol Club, Inc.
- Nickname: Criollos
- Founded: 1981
- Stadium: Asociación Central de Balompié de Puerto Rico Stadium; Caguas, Puerto Rico
- Capacity: 1,200
- Chairman: (Puerto Rico) José O. Ortíz
- Manager: (Puerto Rico) Luis Garcia
- League: Liga Nacional de Fútbol de Puerto Rico
- 2015: 1st (champions)
- Website: https://www.criollosfcpr.com

Criollos de Caguas FC is a soccer team that plays in the Liga Nacional de Fútbol de Puerto Rico. The team was founded in 1981. Since then has won multiple titles and participated in international tournaments including a 1986 visit to Portsmouth, England. The team finished third in the LNF 2011 season, sixth in 2012 season and third on 2013 and has been the champions in the PRSL Super Cup 2014, League 2014 and the Super Cup 2015. The Team will make the official debut on the Liga Nacional de Fútbol de Puerto Rico in the 2015 season on Sunday, September 20, 2015. The team plays their home matches in the Asociación Central de Balompie de Puerto Rico in Caguas, Puerto Rico.

== Puerto Rico Soccer League ==
The PRSL current format is a Supercup prior the start of the season. The PRSL consists in 6 teams from all parts of Puerto Rico. The Criollos de Caguas FC won the Supercup 2014 in a dramatic fashion against the Bayamón FC on June 8, 2014 on the 89th minute 2–1.

== First Division ==
February 10, 2017 The First Division team. The coach is Luis Garcia. The current roster: Note: Flags indicate national team as defined under FIFA eligibility rules; some limited exceptions apply. Players may hold more than one non-FIFA nationality.

No.	Pos.	Nation	Player
12	GK	PUR	Edwin R. Pagan
1	GK	PUR	Johnny Santana
16	GK	PUR	Steven Oliveras
2	DF	PUR	Joan Morales
3	DF	HON	Carlos Rodriguez Reconco
4	DF	PUR	Adam Lopez
6	DF	PUR	Carlos Fernandez
14	DF	PUR	Alexander Felgenfrefer
22	DF	PUR	Elliot Vélez
13	MF	PUR	Juan Coca
15	MF	JAM	Tyrone Harrison

No.	Pos.	Nation	Player
19	MF	VEN	Tarek Smaili
5	MF	COL	Jairo I. Jauregui
7	MF	PUR	Sebastian Garcia
8	MF	PUR	Jean C. Mangual
10	MF	PUR	Felix Dawson
17	MF	PUR	Esteban A. Olivari
18	MF	PUR	Brandom Garcia
9	FW	PUR	Carlos Rodriguez Ramos
11	FW	PUR	Jose I. Gonzalez
20	FW	PUR	Jorge A. Marin
21	FW	JAM	Dwayne Phidd

== Club hierarchy ==
- Chairman: José O. Ortiz, MD
- President: Kermit Ortiz
- Club Treasurer: Hector Santana
- Club Secretary: Joan Morales

== International Friendlies ==
=== 2017 ===
- March 12 - Criollos De Caguas FC [#] v (Cayman Islands) Scholars International SC [#]

== Achievements ==
- Puerto Rico Soccer League
  - Champions: 2014
- Liga Nacional de Fútbol de Puerto Rico
  - Champions: 2015

=== Domestic Cups ===
- Super Copa de Fútbol Gigante
  - Champions: 2014
- Excellence Cup
  - Champions: 2015
- Bayamon Cup
  - Champions: 2015, 2016
- Copa Mickey Jimenez
  - Champions: 2016
