= Caguas Sporting FC =

Association football club based in Caguas, Puerto Rico

- Full name: Caguas Sporting Fútbol Club
- Founded: 2016; 10 years ago
- Stadium: Parque Villa del Rey; Caguas, Puerto Rico
- Capacity: 1,200
- Owner(s): Christopher Valles; Dennis Valenzuela; Theodore Benítez; Carter Moyano
- Chairman: Lisa Collazo
- Manager: Fernando Reyes
- League: Liga Puerto Rico Pro
- 2026 Clausura: Regular Season: 5th
- Website: facebook.com
Home colors	Away colors	Third colors

Caguas Sporting FC is a Puerto Rican association football team from Caguas. They currently play in the Liga Puerto Rico Pro.

== History ==
On November 28, 2016, it was announced that Jorge Oscar Rosa would be the first manager the club.

On March 12, 2017 the team announced the inauguration of their new updated playing field for the coming season, "el parque del Sector La Macanea". The field is to be co-hosted with Los Santos FC due to an alliance Caguas Sporting FC to establish a soccer based program from baby soccer to the senior team with a philosophy of play and training designed to develop high level players.

On November 5, 2020 it was announced the team was able to return to Ángel O Berrios Complex., after several years of using fields in other municipalities due to damage caused by Hurricane Maria in 2017. The field has a new 325 X 190 feet pitch of synthetic turf, costing around $220,000.

On February 22 2022, Oliver Mendoza was announced as the new manager.

=== Copa de Excellencia III ===
Caguas Sporting started off the Puerto Rico Soccer League in the third Cup of Excellence playing their first match against GPS Puerto Rico, losing 2–4. Olvin Ortiz scored two in the game.

=== Kit History ===
Kit sponsorship
Kit supplier	Period	Ref.
(Spain) Joma	2025-2026	
(Puerto Rico) Kamino Nuevo	2026-present	

== Current squad ==
As of February, 16 2026

Note: Flags indicate national team as defined under FIFA eligibility rules; some limited exceptions apply. Players may hold more than one non-FIFA nationality.

No.	Pos.	Nation	Player
1	GK	PUR	Mario Oronoz
2	DF	PUR	Jorge Velazquez
4	DF	PUR	Caleb Marchany
15	DF	PUR	Eric Nieves
45	DF	PUR	Edward Sáez
5	MF	PUR	Juan Correa
10	MF	USA	Joseph Polizzi
9	MF	PUR	Julián Terrón
20	FW	PUR	Yulian Rodriguez
11	FW	USA	Joseph Dotson
7	MF	PUR	Christian Vargas

No.	Pos.	Nation	Player
30	GK	PUR	Jonangel Colón
28	DF	PUR	Diego Rodríguez
32	MF	PUR	Marlon López
6	DF	USA	Daniel Gerard
24	DF	PUR	Bryan Laboy
27	FW	PUR	Diego Luna
14	FW	PUR	Lisandro Núñez
21	DF	PUR	Tyrese Carrión
8	MF	USA	Trevor Gee

== Club hierarchy ==
General Manager:

President : Lisa Collazo

Vice President :

Technical Director : Jorge Oscar Rosa

== Domestic history ==
Key

Champion Runners-up 3rd Place

=== Year-by-year ===
Season	PRSL									Playoffs	CFU Club Championship	Top goalscorer		Managers
Season	Div.	Pos.	Pl.	W	D	L	GS	GA	P	Playoffs	CFU Club Championship	Name	League	Managers
2016	Apertura	11th	13	3	2	8	15	28	11	DNQ	Did not enter	(Puerto Rico) Unknown	?	(Puerto Rico) Jorge Oscar Rosa
2016	Clausura	10th	10	0	1	9	11	31	1	DNQ	Did not enter	(Puerto Rico) Unknown	?	(Puerto Rico) Jorge Oscar Rosa
2017	1st	4th	9	4	2	3	26	19	14	DNQ	Did not enter	(Puerto Rico) Miguel Rivera	11	(Puerto Rico) Jorge Oscar Rosa
Season	LPR Pro									Playoffs	CFU Club Championship	Top goalscorer		Managers
Season	Div.	Pos.	Pl.	W	D	L	GS	GA	P	Playoffs	CFU Club Championship	Name	League	Managers
2018-19	1st	5th	21	7	3	11	40	61	24	Quarterfinals	Did not enter	(Puerto Rico) Miguel Rivera	13	(Puerto Rico)
2019-20	1st	7th	16	6	2	8	37	28	20	Cancelled	Did not enter	(Puerto Rico)	-	(Puerto Rico)
2020-21	Season Cancelled due to COVID													(Puerto Rico)
2021	1st	6th	6	0	2	4	9	29	2	DNQ	Did not enter	(Puerto Rico)	-	(Puerto Rico)
2022	1st	7th	14	1	2	11	11	67	5	DNQ	Did not enter	(Puerto Rico)	-	(Spain) Oliver Mendoza
2022-23	Apertura	5th	8	1	2	5	5	20	5	DNQ	Did not enter	(Puerto Rico)	-	(Spain) Oliver Mendoza
2022-23	Clausura	6th	5	1	1	3	7	16	4	DNQ	Did not enter	(Puerto Rico)	-	(Spain) Oliver Mendoza
2023-24	Apertura	6th	7	1	2	4			5	Semi-Finals*	Did not enter	(Puerto Rico) Joseph Acevedo	7	(Spain) Oliver Mendoza
2023-24	Clausura	6th	7	3	1	3	20	17	10	DNQ	Did not enter	(Puerto Rico) Ian Rodriguez	9	(Puerto Rico) Rafael Ramos
2024-25	Apertura	3rd	9	6	1	2	40	15	19	Semi-finals	Did not enter	(Puerto Rico) Christian Vargas	9	(Puerto Rico) Rafael Ramos
2024-25	Clausura	8th	18	5	2	11	28	44	17	DNQ	Did not enter	(Puerto Rico)	?	(Puerto Rico) Rafael Ramos
2025-26	Apertura	5th	18	12	0	6	65	28	36	DNQ	Did not enter	(Puerto Rico) Christian Vargas	13	(Puerto Rico) Rafael Ramos
2025-26	Clausura	5th	20	11	4	5	65	24	37	DNQ	Did not enter	(Puerto Rico) Christian Vargas	11	(Puerto Rico) Rafael Ramos
2026-27	Apertura	-							-	-	To be determined.	(Puerto Rico)	-	(Puerto Rico) Fernando Reyes
2026-27	Clausura	-	-	-	-	-	-	-	-	-	To be determined.	(Puerto Rico)	-	(Puerto Rico) Fernando Reyes

== Achievements ==
- Puerto Rico Soccer League: 0

Runners-up (0):
