= 2020–21 Liga Puerto Rico season =

Liga Puerto Rico
- Matches: 0

The 2020–21 Liga Puerto Rico season was to be the third season of the Liga Puerto Rico, the top tier soccer league on the island. Metropolitan FA were the reigning champions because of their 2018–19 Liga Puerto Rico championship. The 2019–2020 season was abandoned in March 2020 because of the COVID-19 pandemic and no new champion was named.

After initially delaying the 2020–2021 season in July 2020, the Puerto Rican Football Federation cancelled the season completely the following month as the pandemic continued.
