= Club Deportivo Barbosa =

Association football club based in Río Grande, Puerto Rico

CD Barbosa
- Full name: Club Deportivo Barbosa
- Nickname: Marlins
- Founded: 1997

Club Deportivo Barbosa is an association football team that plays in Rio Grande. They currently play in the Puerto Rico Soccer League.

This team is from Rio Grande, Puerto Rico.

== Club hierarchy ==
General Manager:

Vice President :

Club treasure :
