= 2026–27 Liga Puerto Rico Pro season =

Eighth season of Liga Puerto Rico Pro

Liga Puerto Rico Pro
- Season: 2026–27
- Dates: Apertura: August 15, 2026 - December 2026
- Matches: 8
- Biggest home win: Apertura: Academia Quintana 3–0 Guaynabo FC (15 August 2026)
- Biggest away win: Apertura: EF Taurinos 0–6 Academia Quintana (24 August 2026)
- All statistics correct as of August 21, 2026.

The 2026-27 Liga Puerto Rico Pro season is the eighth season of Liga Puerto Rico Pro, and the third under that name. It is the league's fifth season to be divided into two championships: the Apertura and the Clausura, each in an identical format and each contested by eight teams. The season was played in a round robin style, with the top four 4 making the playoffs.

== Clubs ==
A total of 9 clubs will participate in the Apertura 2026–27 edition of the Liga Puerto Rico Pro. Guayama FC and FC Mayagüez were announced to not be returning for this season.

=== Stadiums and locations ===
Club	Location	Stadium	Capacity
Academia Quintana	San Juan	Estadio Benjamín Martínez González	1,500
Caguas Sporting FC	Caguas	Parque Villa del Rey	1,200
DS Edusoccer Puerto Rico	Mayagüez	Estadio Centroamericano	12,175
EF Taurinos de Cayey	Cayey	Estadio Angel Luis Correa	1,000
Guaynabo FC	Guaynabo	Guaynabo FC Soccer Field	1,000
Metropolitan FA	San Juan	Parque Reparto Metropolitano	1,000
Ponce FC	Ponce	Polideportivo Los Caobos	?
Puerto Rico Surf SC	Guaynabo	Complejo Deportivo Torrimar	1,000
San Juan FC	San Juan	Estadio Sixto Escobar	?

Apertura Changes
▲ Joining	▼ Leaving
None.	FC Mayagüez
	Guayama FC

=== Managerial/coaching changes ===
Club	Outgoing manager/coach	Manner of departure	Date of vacancy	Replaced by	Date of appointment	Position in table	Ref.
Pre-Apertura changes
Academia Quintana	(Puerto Rico) Javier Torres	Mutual agreement	24 July 2026	(Puerto Rico) Elismael Ortiz	August 5, 2026	Pre–season	
Caguas Sporting FC	(Puerto Rico) Rafael Ramos	Mutual agreement	?	(Puerto Rico) Fernando Reyes	July 9, 2026	Pre–season	
EF Taurinos de Cayey	(Puerto Rico) José Martinez	Remain as President	August 13, 2026	(Puerto Rico) Rafael Ramos	August 13, 2026	Pre–season	?
Guaynabo FC	(Puerto Rico) Héctor Rivera	Mutual agreement	?	(Argentina) (Puerto Rico) Sebastián Uranga	July 20, 2026	Pre–season	
Puerto Rico Surf SC	(Puerto Rico) Elismael Ortiz	Mutual agreement	28 July 2026	(Puerto Rico) Javier Torres	August 5, 2026	Pre–season	
Ponce FC	(Puerto Rico) Jahaziel Acosta	New Job in DR; Jarabacoa FC	28 April 2026	(Mexico) David Martinez	July 17, 2026	Pre–season	
Apertura changes
DS Edusoccer	(Spain) David Guillemat	Remain as President	8 September 2026	(Venezuela) Julio Cesar Infante	8 September 2026	1st	
EF Taurinos de Cayey	(Puerto Rico) Rafael Ramos	Remain as President	26 September 2026	(Puerto Rico) Heber Soto	27 September 2026	6th	

=== Personnel and kits ===
Club	Chairman	Head coach	Captain	Kit manufacturer	Shirt sponsor(s)	
Club	Chairman	Head coach	Captain	Kit manufacturer	Front	Other
Academia Quintana	(Puerto Rico) Benjamin Martinez	(Puerto Rico) Elismael Ortiz	TBA	(Ecuador) Boman Sport	YOUNG KINGZ	List: Front: National Lumber & Hardware PR; Back: None; Sleeves: None; Shorts: None; Socks: None
Caguas Sporting FC	(Puerto Rico) Lisa Collazo	(Puerto Rico) Fernando Reyes	(Puerto Rico) Lisandro Núñez	(Puerto Rico) KM; Kamino Nuevo	None	List: Front: None; Back: None; Sleeves: Visit Caguas; Shorts: None; Socks: None
DS Edusoccer	(Spain) David Guillemat	(Venezuela) Julio Cesar Infante	(Puerto Rico) David Marrero	(United States) Nike	None	List: Front: None; Back: None; Sleeves: None; Shorts: None; Socks: None
EF Taurinos de Cayey	(Puerto Rico) Jose Martinez	(Puerto Rico) Rafael Ramos	(Puerto Rico) Heber Soto	Unknown	N&CS Consulting Group, Inc	List: Front: Municipio de Cayey; Back: None; Sleeves: Supermercados Selectos de Aibonito; Shorts: None; Socks: None
Guaynabo FC		(Argentina) (Puerto Rico) Sebastián Uranga	(Puerto Rico) Jean Maldonado	(Paraguay) Oqiqo Sport	Venus Pizza PR	List: Front: None; Back: Defense Puerto Rico; Sleeves: None; Shorts: None; Socks: None
Metropolitan FA	(Argentina) Jorge Silvetti	(Argentina) Jorge Silvetti	(Puerto Rico) José Ferrer	Unknown	San Juan; Ciudad Capital	List: Front: Mobil; Back: Casa de Empeño Oro Verde Joyería; Sleeves: None; Shorts: None; Socks: None
Ponce FC	(Argentina) Lucas Medina	(Mexico) David Martinez	(Colombia) Edgar Guzmán	(Puerto Rico) Esh Sport	Auto Mull AutoPonceno	List: Front: None; Back: None; Sleeves: None; Shorts: None; Socks: None
Puerto Rico Surf SC	(Puerto Rico) Marco Velez	(Puerto Rico) Javier Torres	(Puerto Rico) Kevin Hernández	(United States) Nike	Team name	List: Front: None; Back: None; Sleeves: None; Shorts: None; Socks: None
San Juan FC	(Puerto Rico) Ricardo Dip	(Puerto Rico) Daniel Galindo	(Puerto Rico) Adrián Prado	Unknown	Universal Insurance PR	List: Front: Napamedia; Back: Tacolandia Hilda Deli; Sleeves: Cafe Regina YSEM Distrubution PR; Shorts: None; Socks: None

==== Notes ====
- August 11th:
  - Metropolitan FA released new kit.
  - Caguas Sporting released new kit with Kamino Nuevo.
- October 14th; Academia Quintana released new kit with Boman Sport.
- October 16th; Guaynabo FC released new kit with Oqiqo Sport and Venus Pizza PR as it's main sponsor.
- November 12th; Puerto Rico SC released new kits.

=== International Players ===
This is a list of players to have been called up to represent their national teams in events during the season:

- Whelan Joseph - U.S. Virgin Islands (Ponce FC)
- Juan O'Neill - Puerto Rico (Academia Quintana)
- Ricardo Rivera - Puerto Rico (Academia Quintana)
- Rodolfo Sulia - Puerto Rico (Academia Quintana)
- Joel Serrano - Puerto Rico (Academia Quintana)
- Christian Vargas - Puerto Rico (Metropolitan FA)
- Dante Williams - Puerto Rico (Academia Quintana)

== Torneo Apertura 2026 ==
=== Standings ===
Pos	Team	Pld	W	D	L	GF	GA	GD	Pts	Qualification or relegation
1	Metropolitan FA	15	13	0	2	39	6	+33	39	Advance to Playoffs
2	Academia Quintana	15	12	0	3	48	18	+30	36	Advance to Playoffs
3	Ponce FC	15	11	3	1	35	19	+16	36	Advance to Playoffs
4	Caguas Sporting FC	16	8	4	4	35	17	+18	28	Advance to Playoffs
5	DS Edusoccer Puerto Rico	15	7	3	5	28	17	+11	24	
6	San Juan FC	15	3	2	10	24	35	−11	11	
7	EF Taurinos	15	2	4	9	15	41	−26	10	
8	Guaynabo FC	15	2	1	12	14	45	−31	7	
9	Puerto Rico Surf SC	15	1	1	13	14	54	−40	4	

Updated to match(es) played on 19 November 2026. Source:

Apertura Changes
▲ Joining	▼ Leaving
None.	FC Mayagüez
	Guayama FC

=== Ladder progression ===
Leader and qualification to playoffs
Qualification to playoffs
Last playoff spot
Last place

2026–27 LPR Pro - Apertura season
Team ╲ Round	1	2	3	4	5	6	7	8	9	10	11	12	13	14	15	16	17	18
Academia Quintana	1	1	3	2	2	1	1	1	1	1	1	1	2	2	2	2	2	
Caguas Sporting FC	3	4	5	5	5	5	5	4	4	4	4	5	5	5	5	4	4	
DS Edusoccer Puerto Rico	2	3	1	1	1	2	4	5	5	5	5	4	4	4	4	5	5	
EF Taurinos de Cayey	5	8	9	9	9	9	9	7	6	6	6	7	8	7	6	6	7	
Guaynabo FC	9	9	8	7	7	7	7	8	8	9	9	6	7	8	8	8	8	
Metropolitan FA	7	5	4	3	3	3	2	3	3	2	2	2	1	1	1	1	1	
Ponce FC	4	2	2	4	4	4	3	2	2	3	3	3	3	3	3	3	3	
Puerto Rico Surf SC	8	7	6	6	6	6	6	6	9	8	8	9	9	9	9	9	9	
San Juan FC	6	6	7	8	8	8	8	9	7	7	7	8	6	6	7	7	6	

Updated to match(es) played on 19 November 2026. Source:

=== Schedule & Results ===
==== Jornada 1 ====
August 15 1	Metropolitan FA	0-1	Ponce FC	San Juan
16:00 EDT		Report	Christian Aragón 81'	Stadium: Parque Reparto Metropolitano

August 15 1	DS Edusoccer	3-1	Puerto Rico Surf SC	Mayagüez
19:00 EDT	Kevin Torres 31'; Alfredo Díaz 45+2'; Alexander López 56'	Report	Kevin Hernández 71'	Stadium: Estadio Centroamericano

August 15 1	Academia Quintana	3-0	Guaynabo FC	San Juan
20:30 EDT	Eriesel Hernández 17'; Ricardo Rivera 19'; Dante Williams 90+1'	Report		Stadium: Estadio Benjamín Martínez

August 16 1	Caguas Sporting FC	2-1	San Juan FC	Caguas
20:30 EDT	Nako Amaré 17'; Lisandro Núñez 17'	Report	Ian Rodriguez 21'	Stadium: Complejo Deportivo Angel O. Berrios

==== Jornada 2 ====
August 22 1	DS Edusoccer	1-1	Caguas Sporting FC	Mayagüez
19:00 EDT	Alfredo Diaz 13'	Report	Nako Amaré 4'	Stadium: Estadio Centroamericano

August 22 1	Ponce FC	3-1	Puerto Rico Surf SC	Ponce
20:30 EDT	Rigoberto Najera 5'; Geovanny Bueso 65', 67'	Report	David Marrero 83'	Stadium: Los Caobos Sports Center

August 23 1	Metropolitan FA	3-0	Guaynabo FC	San Juan
20:30 EDT	Joel Burgos 17'; Alexander Blanche 35'; Jackie Marrero 76'	Report		Stadium: Parque Reparto Metropolitano

August 23 1	EF Taurinos de Cayey	0-6	Academia Quintana	San Juan
20:30 EDT		Report	Ricardo Rivera 22', 30', 85'; Adrian Diaz Faísca 45+1'; L. Baez 79'; Jan Luis Rivera 88'	Stadium: Estadio Benjamín Martínez

==== Jornada 3 ====
August 29 1	Metropolitan FA	4-0	EF Taurinos de Cayey	San Juan
16:00 EDT	Christian Vargas 12', 41'; Alexander Blanche 23'; Jackie Marrero 47'	Report		Stadium: Parque Reparto Metropolitano

August 29 1	DS Edusoccer	4-1	San Juan FC	Mayagüez
17:00 EDT	Gianfranco Orama 53'; Kevin Torres 65', 74'; Johniel Waters 79'	Report	Ian Rodriguez 69'	Stadium: Estadio Centroamericano

August 29 1	Ponce FC	2-2	Caguas Sporting FC	Ponce
20:30 EDT	Rigoberto Najera 30'; Teo Candido 44'	Report	Diego Amarilla 23'; Michael Rivera 84'	Stadium: Los Caobos Sports Center

August 30 1	Puerto Rico Surf SC	3-0	Guaynabo FC	San Juan
20:30 EDT	David Marrero 65'; Alfonso Reyes 67'; Kevin Hernández 73'	Report		Stadium: Estadio Benjamín Martínez

==== Jornada 4 ====
September 2 1	Academia Quintana	3-2	Caguas Sporting FC	San Juan
20:30 EDT	Adrian Diaz Faísca 18'; Ricardo Rivera 45+3'; Tomas Fernandez 58'	Report	Joseph Dotson 23'; Diego Amarilla 81'	Stadium: Estadio Benjamín Martínez

September 2 1	DS Edusoccer	6-0	EF Taurinos de Cayey	Mayagüez
20:30 EDT	Gianfranco Orama 17'; Kevin Torres 45', 80'; Alfredo Diaz 48'; Emillen Rene 57'; Javiern Fonseca 72'	Report		Stadium: Estadio Centroamericano

September 2 1	Metropolitan FA	4-1	Puerto Rico Surf SC	San Juan
20:30 EDT	Joel Burgos 3', 21'; Julian Terron 43'; Joseph Marrero 84'	Report	Kevin Hernandez 63'	Stadium: Parque Reparto Metropolitano

September 3 1	Guaynabo FC	1-0	San Juan FC	San Juan
20:30 EDT	Jordan Perez 31'	Report		Stadium: Estadio Benjamín Martínez

==== Jornada 5 ====
September 5 1	DS Edusoccer	6-0	Guaynabo FC	Mayagüez
19:00 EDT	Alexander Lopez 7', 63'; Kevin Torres 22', 43'; Gianfranco Orama 28'; Alfredo Diaz 53'			Stadium: Estadio Centroamericano

September 5 1	Academia Quintana	2-1	Metropolitan FA	San Juan
20:30 EDT	Ricardo Rivera 24'; Carlos Yosuan Gonzalez 41'		Héctor Ramos 66'	Stadium: Estadio Benjamín Martínez

September 6 1	Ponce FC	3-3	San Juan FC	Ponce
20:30 EDT	Mandell Francois 4'; Rigoberto Najera 6'; Edgar Guzman 90+5'	Report	Adrian Quintero 45+3'; Alex Chaparro 54'; Jan Mateo 60'	Stadium: Los Caobos Sports Center

September 6 1	Caguas Sporting FC	1-0	EF Taurinos de Cayey	San Juan
20:30 EDT	Nako Amare 51'			Stadium: Estadio Benjamín Martínez

==== Jornada 6 ====
September 12 1	Caguas Sporting FC	0-1	Metropolitan FA	San Juan
16:30 EDT		Report	Alexander Blanche 66'	Stadium: Estadio Benjamín Martínez

September 12 1	Ponce FC	1-0	Guaynabo FC	Ponce
20:30 EDT	Jason Chunchi 20'	Report		Stadium: Los Caobos Sports Center

September 12 1	San Juan FC	0-6	Academia Quintana	San Juan
20:30 EDT		Report	Carlos Gonzalez 34'; Adrian Diaz Faísca 41'; Jan Luis Rivera 47'; Ricardo Rivera 60'; Ian Martinez 65'; Dante Williams 81'	Stadium: Estadio Benjamín Martínez

September 13 1	Puerto Rico Surf SC	1-1	EF Taurinos de Cayey	San Juan
20:30 EDT	Andres Suarez 35'	Report	Roberto De Leon 86'	Stadium: Estadio Benjamín Martínez

==== Jornada 7 ====
September 19 1	Metropolitan FA	3-0	San Juan FC	San Juan
14:00 EDT	Joel Burgos 6'; Jackie Marrero 56'; Cristian Vargas 90+2'	Report		Stadium: Parque Reparto Metropolitano

September 19 1	Ponce FC	2-1	EF Taurinos de Cayey	Ponce
20:30 EDT	Gnonoua Florian 17'; Rigoberto Najera 89'	Report	Uriel Zarracan 51'	Stadium: Los Caobos Sports Center

September 19 1	Academia Quintana	1-0	DS Edusoccer	San Juan
20:30 EDT	Lorenzo Baez 78'	Report		Stadium: Estadio Benjamín Martínez

September 20 1	Puerto Rico Surf SC	2-6	Caguas Sporting FC	San Juan
20:30 EDT	Andres Suarez 59'; Kevin Hernandez 78'	Report	Diego Amarilla 37', 86'; Lucas Espada 45+1'; Trevor Gee 61'; Nako Amare 65', 83'	Stadium: Estadio Benjamín Martínez

==== Jornada 8 ====
September 30 1	Puerto Rico Surf SC	0-3	Academia Quintana	San Juan
20:30 EDT		Report	Jan Luis Rivera 15', 44'; Adrian Diaz Faísca 84'	Stadium: Estadio Benjamín Martínez
Note: Game was originally postponed on September 23rd, and rescheduled for September 30th.

September 23 1	DS Edusoccer	1-2	Ponce FC	Mayagüez
20:30 EDT	Alexander Lopez 26'		Teo Candido 52'; Rigoberto Najera 60'	Stadium: Estadio Centroamericano

September 23 1	EF Taurinos de Cayey	4-3	San Juan FC	Cayey
20:30 EDT	William Fatzinger 5'; Roland Lopez 50'; Izan Ruiz 61'; Edgar Santiago 84'		Jorge Rosa 64'; Ian Rodriguez 79'; Francisco Berdasco 90+5'	Stadium: Angel Luis Correa #3

September 24 1	Caguas Sporting FC	1-0	Guaynabo FC	San Juan
20:30 EDT	Nako Amare 22'			Stadium: Estadio Benjamín Martínez

==== Jornada 9 ====
September 26 1	Metropolitan FA	2-0	DS Edusoccer	San Juan
16:00 EDT	Jackie Marrero 44' (pen.); Alexander Blanche 77'	Report		Stadium: Parque Reparto Metropolitano

September 26 1	San Juan FC	6-0	Puerto Rico Surf SC	San Juan
16:30 EDT	Francisco Berdasco 30', 56', 61'; Carter Laatsch 63'; John Corte 85'; Adrian Quintero 89'	Report		Stadium: Estadio Benjamín Martínez

September 26 1	Ponce FC	3-1	Academia Quintana	Ponce
20:30 EDT	Rigoberto Najera 13', 53', 62'	Report	Jan Luis Rivera 10'	Stadium: Los Caobos Sports Center

September 26 1	Guaynabo FC	4-4	EF Taurinos de Cayey	San Juan
20:30 EDT	Jean Maldonado 27'; Jordan Perez 47'; Hector Rodriguez 60'; Oluwatobi Adebinjo 85'	Report	Uriel Zarracan 17', 19', 35'; Edgard Santiago 90+3'	Stadium: Estadio Benjamín Martínez

==== Jornada 10 ====
October 10 1	Guaynabo FC	0-3	Academia Quintana	San Juan
16:30 EDT		Report	Adrian Diaz Faísca 44'; Dante Williams 55', 90+3'	Stadium: Estadio Benjamín Martínez

October 10 1	Ponce FC	0-1	Metropolitan FA	Ponce
20:30 EDT		Report	Mandell Francois , 68' (o.g.)	Stadium: Los Caobos Sports Center

October 10 1	San Juan FC	0-3	Caguas Sporting FC	San Juan
20:30 EDT		Report	Nako Amare 2'; Joseph Dotson 49'; Brennan McNulty 69'	Stadium: Estadio Benjamín Martínez

October 11 1	Puerto Rico Surf SC	0-1	DS Edusoccer	San Juan
20:30 EDT		Report	Kevin Torres 90+4'	Stadium: Estadio Benjamín Martínez

==== Jornada 11 ====
October 17 1	Caguas Sporting FC	1-1	DS Edusoccer	San Juan
16:30 EDT	Diego Amarilla 63' (pen.)	Report	Kevin Torres 15'	Stadium: Estadio Benjamín Martínez

October 17 1	Puerto Rico Surf SC	1-3	Ponce FC	San Juan
20:30 EDT	Alfonso Reyes 90+2'	Report	Geovanny Bueso 25'; Teo Candido 39'; Christian Aragon 72'	Stadium: Estadio Benjamín Martínez

October 18 1	Guaynabo FC	0-3	Metropolitan FA	San Juan
16:30 EDT		Report	Joseph Marrero 35' (pen.); Alexander Blanche 43'; Christian Vargas 87'	Stadium: Estadio Benjamín Martínez

October 18 1	Academia Quintana	4-0	EF Taurinos de Cayey	San Juan
20:30 EDT	Adrian Diaz Faísca 31', 72'; Ricardo Rivera 65'; Jan Luis Rivera 79' (pen.)	Report		Stadium: Estadio Benjamín Martínez

==== Jornada 12 ====
October 24 1	Caguas Sporting FC	1-2	Ponce FC	San Juan
16:30 EDT	Daniel Gerard 35'	Report	Rigoberto Najera 45+1', 77'	Stadium: Estadio Benjamín Martínez

October 24 1	Guaynabo FC	3-1	Puerto Rico Surf SC	San Juan
20:30 EDT	Oluwatobi Adebinjo 12'; Jean Maldonado 21'; Jordan Perez 90+3'	Report	Kevin Hernández 38'	Stadium: Estadio Benjamín Martínez

October 25 1	EF Taurinos de Cayey	0-1	Metropolitan FA	Cayey
20:30 EDT		Report	Joel Burgos 18'	Stadium: Angel Luis Correa #3

October 25 1	San Juan FC	0-1	DS Edusoccer	San Juan
20:30 EDT		Report	Alfredo Diaz 70'	Stadium: Estadio Benjamín Martínez

==== Jornada 13 ====
October 28 1	Caguas Sporting FC	2-3	Academia Quintana	San Juan
20:30 EDT	Michael Rivera 77', 87'	Report	Lorenzo Baez 14'; Tomas Fernandez 73'; Diego Torres 89'	Stadium: Estadio Benjamín Martínez

Note: Academia Quintana was forced to forfeit due to a substitution violation, Caguas Sporting given a 5-0 win.

October 28 1	Puerto Rico Surf SC	0-6	Metropolitan FA	San Juan
20:30 EDT		Report	Joel Burgos 3'; Jorge Rivera 9', 45+5'; Jheyron Ocasio 47'; Hector Ramos 73'; Karlos Ferrer 90+2'	Stadium: Parque Reparto Metropolitano

October 28 1	EF Taurinos de Cayey	1-1	DS Edusoccer	Cayey
20:30 EDT	Eric Kilosho 90'	Report	Alfredo Diaz 26'	Stadium: Angel Luis Correa #3

October 29 1	San Juan FC	3-1	Guaynabo FC	San Juan
20:30 EDT	Adrian Quintero 30'; Jorge Rosa 30'; Carter Laatsch 61'	Report	Jordan Perez 86'	Stadium: Estadio Benjamín Martínez

==== Jornada 14 ====
October 31 1	Metropolitan FA	4-1	Academia Quintana	San Juan
16:00 EDT	Jorge Rivera 10', 56'; Karlos Ferrer 69'; Joseph Marrero 89' (pen.)	Report	Jan Luis Rivera 30' (pen.)	Stadium: Parque Reparto Metropolitano

October 31 1	Guaynabo FC	1-2	DS Edusoccer	San Juan
16:30 EDT	Oluwatobi Adebinjo 70'	Report	Alexander Lopez 33'; Diego Santiago 46'	Stadium: Estadio Benjamín Martínez

October 31 1	EF Taurinos de Cayey	0-0	Caguas Sporting FC	San Juan
20:30 EDT		Report		Stadium: Estadio Benjamín Martínez

November 1 1	San Juan FC	1-1	Ponce FC	San Juan
20:30 EDT	Andres Bartolomei 36'	Report	Rigoberto Najera 22'	Stadium: Estadio Benjamín Martínez

==== Jornada 15 ====
November 7 1	Metropolitan FA	2-0	Caguas Sporting FC	San Juan
16:00 EDT	Jorge Rivera 59'; Julian Terron 78'	Report		Stadium: Parque Reparto Metropolitano

November 7 1	Guaynabo FC	3-4	Ponce FC	San Juan
16:30 EDT	Oluwatobi Adebinjo 56'; Evan Pollensvoigt 61'; Jordan Perez 69'		Rigoberto Najera 26', 45'; Joseph Pereira 78'; Teo Candido 87'	Stadium: Estadio Benjamín Martínez

November 7 1	Academia Quintana	2-1	San Juan FC	San Juan
20:30 EDT	Jan Luis Rivera 22'; Ricardo Rivera 77' (pen.)	Report	Francisco Berdasco 51'	Stadium: Estadio Benjamín Martínez

November 8 1	EF Taurinos de Cayey	2-0	Puerto Rico Surf SC	San Juan
20:30 EDT	Nathaniel Campell 42'; Izan Ruiz 44'	Report		Stadium: Estadio Benjamín Martínez

==== Jornada 16 ====
November 14 1	Caguas Sporting FC	2-1	Puerto Rico Surf SC	San Juan
16:30 EDT	Diego Amarilla 25'; Jesus De Jesus 75'	Report	Alfonso Reyes 19'	Stadium: Estadio Benjamín Martínez

November 14 1	DS Edusoccer	0-2	Academia Quintana	Mayagüez
19:00 EDT		Report	Jan Luis Rivera 49'; Ricardo Rojas 51'	Stadium: Estadio Centroamericano

November 14 1	San Juan FC	1-4	Metropolitan FA	San Juan
20:30 EDT	Adrian Prado 55'	Report	Jorge Rivera 3'; Joel Burgos 24'; Joseph Marrero 84', 86'	Stadium: Estadio Benjamín Martínez

November 15 1	EF Taurinos de Cayey	2-4	Ponce FC	San Juan
20:30 EDT	Nathaniel Campbe 56'; Roland Lopez 78'	Report	Christian Aragon 25'; Teo Candido 37'; Rigoberto Najera 66', 70'	Stadium: Estadio Benjamín Martínez

==== Jornada 17 ====
November 18 1	Guaynabo FC	1-8	Caguas Sporting FC	Cayey
20:30 EDT	Oluwatobi Adebinjo 38'		Cedric Rodriguez 13'; Nako Amare 18', 53', 75'; Jonathon Torres 30'; Diego Amarilla 51'; Lisandro Nunez 68'; Michael Rivera 79'	Stadium: Angel Luis Correa #3

November 18 1	Ponce FC	4-1	DS Edusoccer	Ponce
20:30 EDT	Rigoberto Najera 4'; Teo Candido 45+1'; Christian Aragon 73'; Jason Chunchi 86'			Stadium: Los Caobos Sports Center

November 18 1	Academia Quintana	11-2	Puerto Rico Surf SC	San Juan
20:30 EDT	Adrian Diaz Faísca 9', 41', 57'; Luis Bermudez 12'; Jan Luis Rivera 27', 45+2', 48', 82'; Kevin Hernandez , 32' (o.g.); Daniel Montero , 55' (o.g.); Dante Williams 84'	Report		Stadium: Estadio Benjamín Martínez

November 19 1	San Juan FC	4-0	EF Taurinos de Cayey	San Juan
20:30 EDT	Francisco Berdasco 31'; Andres Bartolomei 35'; Adrian Quintero 88'; Juan Bustamante 90+2'	Report		Stadium: Estadio Benjamín Martínez

==== Jornada 18 ====
November 21 1	DS Edusoccer	2-4	Metropolitan FA	Mayagüez
19:00 EDT	Alexander Lopez 64'; Yahir Gonzalez 87'	Report	Byron Ortiz 5'; Jorge Rivera 34', 78'; James Valkenburg 71'	Stadium: Estadio Centroamericano

November 21 1	Academia Quintana	5-0	Ponce FC	San Juan
20:30 EDT	Rodolfo Sulia 16'; Dante Williams 29'; Carlos Gonzalez 87', 90'; Eriesel Hernandez 90+2'	Report		Stadium: Estadio Benjamín Martínez

November 22 1	Puerto Rico Surf SC	v	San Juan FC	San Juan
20:30 EDT				Stadium: Estadio Benjamín Martínez

November 22 1	EF Taurinos de Cayey	v	Guaynabo FC	Cayey
20:30 EDT				Stadium: Angel Luis Correa #3

=== Regular season statistics ===
- First goal of the season:
  (Colombia) Christian Aragón for Ponce FC against Metropolitan FA (15 August 2026 - Wk1)
- First Hat-trick of the season:
  (Puerto Rico) Ricardo Rivera for Academia Quintana against EF Taurinos de Cayey (23 August 2026 - Wk2)

Top Goalscorers
Rank	Player	Club	Goals
1	(Mexico) Rigoberto Najera	Ponce FC	16
2	(Puerto Rico) Jan Luis Rivera	Academia Quintana	13
4	(Puerto Rico) Adrian Diaz Faísca	Academia Quintana	10
4	(Botswana) Nako Amare	Caguas Sporting FC	10
5	(Puerto Rico) Kevin Torres	DS Edusoccer	9
5	(Puerto Rico) Ricardo Rivera	Academia Quintana	9
5	(Puerto Rico) Joseph Marrero	Metropolitan FA	9
8	(Puerto Rico) Alfredo Díaz Faísca	DS Edusoccer	7
8	(Puerto Rico) Joel Burgos	Metropolitan FA	7
8	(Puerto Rico) Diego Amarilla	Caguas Sporting FC	7

Updated to match(es) played on 19 November 2026.

Most Clean Sheets
Rank	Goalkeeper	Club	Clean Sheets
1	(Canada) (Portugal) Philip Reis	Metropolitan FA	6
2	(Puerto Rico) Joel Serrano	Academia Quintana	5
3	(Canada) Aiden Rushenas	DS Edusoccer	4
3	(United States) Ernesto Márquez	Metropolitan FA	4
3	(Puerto Rico) Mario Oronoz	Caguas Sporting FC	4
6	(United States Virgin Islands) Whelan Joseph	Ponce FC	2
6	(United States) Zachary Fontenot	EF Taurinos	2
6	(Puerto Rico) Yoksan Rosario	Academia Quintana	2
9	(Puerto Rico) Juan Bustamante	San Juan FC	1
9	(Puerto Rico) Jacob Wlodinguer	Guaynabo FC	1
9	(Puerto Rico) Jeremy Sálamo	Academia Quintana	1
9	(United States) James Anderson	San Juan FC	1

Updated to match(es) played on 19 November 2026.

==== Hat-tricks ====
Player	For	Against	Result	Date	Week
Hat-tricks
(Puerto Rico) Ricardo Rivera	Academia Quintana	EF Taurinos	0–6 (A)	23 August 2026	2
(Puerto Rico) Francisco Berdasco	San Juan FC	Puerto Rico Surf SC	6–0 (H)	26 September 2026	9
(Mexico) Rigoberto Najera	Ponce FC	Academia Quintana	3–1 (H)	26 September 2026	9
(United States) (Argentina) Uriel Zarracan	EF Taurinos	Guaynabo FC	4–4 (A)	26 September 2026	9
(Botswana) Nako Amare	Caguas Sporting FC	Guaynabo FC	1–8 (A)	18 November 2026	17
(Puerto Rico) Adrian Diaz Faísca	Academia Quintana	Puerto Rico Surf SC	11–2 (H)	18 November 2026	17
Four-Goal Haul (Póker)
(Puerto Rico) Jan Luis Rivera	Academia Quintana	Puerto Rico Surf SC	11–2 (H)	18 November 2026	17
