= 2024–25 Liga Puerto Rico Pro season =

Liga Puerto Rico Pro
- Season: 2024–25
- Champions: Apertura: Academia Quintana (3rd title); Clausura: Metropolitan FA (5th title)
- CFU Club Shield: Metropolitan FA

The 2024–25 Liga Puerto Rico Pro season was the sixth season of Liga Puerto Rico Pro, and the first under that name. It was the league's third season to be divided into two championships: the Apertura and the Clausura, each in an identical format and each contested by ten teams. The season was played in a round robin style, with the top four 4 making the playoffs.

Academia Quintana were the defending champions, winning both the Apertura and Clausura in the previous season. The team won the Apertura this season, defeating Metropolitan FA 2–1 in extra time. Metropolitan FA won the Clausura tournament.

== Torneo Apertura 2024 ==
=== Regular season ===
	Team	GP	W	D	L	GF	GA	GD	Pts.
1	Academia Quintana	9	8	1	0	58	3	+55	25
2	Metropolitan FA	9	7	1	1	35	8	+27	22
3	Caguas Sporting FC	9	6	1	2	40	15	+25	19
4	Puerto Rico Surf SC	9	4	1	4	19	17	+2	13
5	San Juan FC	9	4	1	4	17	18	-1	13
6	MK Elite SA	9	4	1	4	20	30	-10	13
7	FC Mayagüez	9	2	4	3	16	26	-10	10
8	Puerto Rico Sol FC	9	3	1	5	9	29	-20	10
9	Caribe SC	9	1	1	7	11	42	-31	4
10	Fraigcomar	9	0	0	9	4	41	-37	0

Apertura Changes
▲ Joining	▼ Leaving
Fraigcomar	Bayamón FC
San Juan FC	Guaynabo FC
MK Elite SA	
Caribe SC	

==== Top goalscorers ====
Players sorted first by goals scored, then by last name.

Rank	Player	Club	Goals
1	(Puerto Rico) Kevin Hernandez	Academia Quintana	12
2	(Puerto Rico) Gerald Díaz	Academia Quintana	11
3	(Argentina) Diego Amarilla	Metropolitan FA	9
3	(Puerto Rico) Christian Vargas	Caguas Sporting FC	9
3	(Colombia) Jhonathan Rivas	FC Mayagüez	9
3	(Puerto Rico) Luis Figueroa	Metropolitan FA	9
7	(Puerto Rico) Marc Nieves	Academia Quintana	8
8	(Puerto Rico) Lisandro Nunez	Caguas Sporting FC	7
8	(Ecuador) Daniel Montero	San Juan FC	7
10	(Puerto Rico) Ian Rodriguez	Caguas Sporting FC	6

=== Playoffs ===
==== Semi-Finals ====
December 7, 2024
16:30 EST (UTC−5)

Metropolitan FA	3–0	Caguas Sporting FC
Diego Amarilla 17'; Michael Rivera 54'; Michael Rivera 61'

Juan Cordero Dávila Stadium, San Juan
Referee: - (Puerto Rico)
December 7, 2024
19:30 EST (UTC−5)

Puerto Rico Surf SC	1–3	Academia Quintana
Matias Secola 85' (pen.)		Kevin Hernández 2'; 56'; Kevin Hernández 67'

Juan Cordero Dávila Stadium, San Juan
Referee: - (Puerto Rico)

==== Championship ====
December 15, 2024
16:30 EST (UTC−5)

Academia Quintana	2–1 (a.e.t.)	Metropolitan FA
Kevin Hernández 76'; Rodolfo Sulia 91'		Jorge Rivera 90+3'

Estadio CentroAmericano, Mayagüez
Referee: - (Puerto Rico)

LPR Champions
Academia Quintana
3rd title
Livestream

== Torneo Clausura 2025 ==
Statistics

	Team	GP	W	D	L	GF	GA	GD	Pts.
1	Metropolitan FA	18	15	3	0	82	11	+71	48
2	Academia Quintana	18	15	3	0	67	15	+52	48
3	Puerto Rico Surf SC	18	12	4	2	50	18	+32	40
4	San Juan FC	18	9	1	8	53	38	+15	28
5	DS Edusoccer	18	8	2	8	32	40	-8	26
6	Ponce FC	18	7	1	10	27	35	-8	22
7	EF Taurinos de Cayey	18	5	4	9	38	55	-17	19
8	Caguas Sporting FC	18	5	2	11	28	44	-16	17
9	FC Mayagüez	18	2	3	13	28	65	-37	9
10	Caribe SC	18	0	1	17	8	92	-84	1

Clausura Changes
▲ Joining	▼ Leaving
EF Taurinos de Cayey	Fraigcomar
DS Edusoccer	Puerto Rico Sol FC
Ponce FC	MK Elite SA

=== Regular season statistics ===
==== Top goalscorers ====
Players sorted first by goals scored, then by last name.

Rank	Player	Club	Goals
1	(Puerto Rico) Kevin Hernandez	Academia Quintana	23
2	(Colombia) Jhonathon Rivas	Mayaguez FC	17
3	(Argentina) Gabriel Mendez	Metropolitan FA	16
4	(Argentina) Bruno Romagnoli	Metropolitan FA	12
4	(Puerto Rico) Javier Hopgood	San Juan FC	12
4	(Puerto Rico) Jorge Rivera	Metropolitan FA	12
7	(Puerto Rico) Diego Santiago	DS Edusoccer	10
9	(Argentina) Jano Barrios	Metropolitan FA	9
9	(Puerto Rico) Jorge Rodriguez	Puerto Rico Surf SC	9
10	(Puerto Rico) Guiwyn Alsina	EF Taurinos de Cayey	8

==== Top assists ====
Rank	Player	Club	Assists
1	(Puerto Rico) -	Metropolitan FA	0
2	(Puerto Rico) -	Metropolitan FA	0
3	(Puerto Rico) -	Bayamon FC	0
3	(Puerto Rico) -	Academia Quintana	0
3	(Puerto Rico) -	Bayamon FC	0

=== Playoffs ===
No playoff tournament was played, Metropolitan FA was named champions of the Clausura season.

LPR Pro Champions
Metropolitan FA
5th title

=== End of Season Award Ceremony ===
The award ceremony took place at Eco's Sports Park on June 16 2025.

- Top Scorer: Kevin Hernandez - Academia Quintana
- Few Goals Conceded: Ernesto Marquez - Metropolitan FA
- Best Coach: Elismael Ortiz - Puerto Rico Surf FC
- Best Player: David Marrero - Puerto Rico Surf FC

== Supercopa 2025 ==
The first Supercopa was played between the winners of both seasons Academia Quintana and Metropolitan FA. The game was supposed to be played on October 15, 2025 but was rescheduled for November 19, 2015. The game was livestreamed and archived on Youtube. beIN SPORTS USA also posted the highlights on theirs. With the victory, Metropolitan FA earned a birth to the 2026 CFU Club Shield.

November 19, 2025
19:00 EST (UTC−5)

Academia Quintana	0–3	Metropolitan FA
		Hector Ramos 4'; Matías Maroni 15'; Michael Rivera 90+3'

Ciudad Deportiva Millito Navarro, Ponce
Referee: - (Puerto Rico)

Academia Quintana
Metropolitan FA

Academia Quintana
GK	1	(Puerto Rico) Yoksan Rosario
LB	4	(Argentina) Tomas Fernandez	(yellow card) 73'
CB	31	(Puerto Rico) Angel Aguas
CB	6	(Guatemala) (Puerto Rico) Juan Cano	(yellow card) 10'	(substituted off) 77'
RB	3	(United States) (Trinidad and Tobago) Ryan Cedeno	(yellow card) 83'
DM	23	(Puerto Rico) Juan O'Neill
DM	22	(Puerto Rico) Ian Martinez	(substituted off) 46'
MF	11	(Puerto Rico) Jan Rivera	(substituted off) 46'
MF	10	(Puerto Rico) Joseph Marrero (c)
MF	7	(Puerto Rico) Eriesel Hernandez	(substituted off) 77'
FW	13	(United States) Kyle Carr	(substituted off) 46'
Substitutes:
DF	18	(Puerto Rico) Rayson Rosario		(substituted on) 46'
MF	19	(Puerto Rico) Wilfredo Rivera		(substituted on) 46'
FW	9	(Puerto Rico) Kevin Torres		(substituted on) 46'
DF	17	(Puerto Rico) Carlos Gonzalez		(substituted on) 77'
MF	32	(Puerto Rico) Victor Reyes		(substituted on) 77'
Manager:
(Puerto Rico) Javier Torres

Metropolitan FA
GK	1	(United States) (Mexico) Ernesto Marquez
LB	28	(Puerto Rico) Matias Maroni	15'
CB	21	(United States) James Valkenburg
CB	8	(Puerto Rico) Jose Ferrer	(yellow card) 59' (c)
RB	2	(Puerto Rico) Fabian Martinez	(yellow card) 72'
DM	12	(Puerto Rico) Derek Rivera	(substituted off) 62'
DM	14	(Argentina) Guillermo Ocampo
MF	10	(Puerto Rico) Jorge Rivera	(substituted off) 62'
MF	24	(Argentina) (Spain) Leonel Coira
DF	20	(Puerto Rico) Luis Lozada	(substituted off) 90+2'
FW	99	(Puerto Rico) Hector Ramos	4'	(substituted off) 84'
Substitutes:
MF	89	(Puerto Rico) Karlos Ferrer		(substituted on) 62'
MF	6	(United States) (Bolivia) Albert Aramayo		(substituted on) 62'
DF	27	(Puerto Rico) Michael Rivera		(substituted on) 84'	90+3'	(yellow card) 90+3'
FW	7	(Argentina) Gabriel Méndez		(substituted on) 90+2'
Manager:
(Argentina) Jorge Silvetti

Man of the match

- --- (Metropolitan FA)

Match rules

- 90 minutes
- Penalty shoot-out if scores level after 90 minutes
- Seven named substitutes
- No maximum on number of substitutions
