= 2023–24 Liga Puerto Rico season =

Liga Puerto Rico
- Season: 2023–24
- Champions: Apertura: Academia Quintana (1st title); Clausura: Academia Quintana (2nd title)
- CFU Club Shield: Academia Quintana
- Stats are from the regular season only Source

The 2023–24 Liga Puerto Rico season, was the fifth season of Liga Puerto Rico. It was the league's second season to be divided into two championships: the Apertura 2023 and the Clausura 2024, each in an identical format and each contested by eight teams. The season was played in a round robin style, with the top four making the playoffs.

Metropolitan FA were the defending champions, winning both tournaments in the previous season, the Apertura and Clausura, earning themselves an entry into the 2024 CFU Club Shield.

== Clausura changes ==
The start the 2024 Clausura season was delayed in early March, due to teams not meeting certain requirements required by CONCACAF. It was reported that enough teams had acquired the required licenses with two new teams joining the league, while two others dropped out.

== Participating teams ==
Apertura 2023
Team	City	Head coach
Academia Quintana	San Juan	(Puerto Rico) --
Bayamón Fútbol Club	Bayamon	(Spain) -- Josep Becerra
Caguas Sporting FC	Caguas	(Puerto Rico) --
Don Bosco FC	San Juan	(Puerto Rico) --
Guaynabo Gol SC	Guaynabo	(Puerto Rico) --
Guayama FC	Guayama	(Puerto Rico) --
Metropolitan FA	San Juan	(Argentina) Jorge Silvetti
Puerto Rico Sol FC	Mayagüez	(Puerto Rico) --

Clausura 2024
Team	City	Head coach
Academia Quintana	San Juan	(Puerto Rico) --
Bayamón Fútbol Club	Bayamon	(Puerto Rico) --
Caguas Sporting FC	Caguas	(Puerto Rico) --
FC Mayagüez	Mayagüez	(Puerto Rico) -
Guaynabo FC	Guaynabo	(Puerto Rico) --
Metropolitan FA	San Juan	(Argentina) Jorge Silvetti
Puerto Rico Sol FC	Mayagüez	(Puerto Rico) --
Puerto Rico Surf SC	Guaynabo	(Puerto Rico) --

== Torneo Apertura ==
=== League table ===
Pos	Team	Pld	W	D	L	GF	GA	GD	Pts
1	Metropolitan FA	7	7	0	0	0	0	0	21
2	Academia Quintana	7	6	0	1	0	0	0	18
3	Guayama FC	7	4	1	2	0	0	0	13
4	Puerto Rico Sol FC	7	3	1	3	0	0	0	10
5	Bayamón FC	7	3	0	4	0	0	0	9
6	Caguas Sporting FC	7	1	2	4	0	0	0	5
7	Guaynabo Gol SC	7	1	0	6	0	0	0	3
8	Don Bosco FC	7	0	2	5	0	0	0	2

Apertura Changes
▲ Joining	▼ Leaving
Bayamón FC	FC Mayagüez
Guaynabo Gol SC	
Guayama FC	

=== Regular season statistics ===
==== Top goalscorers ====
Players sorted first by goals scored, then by last name.

Rank	Player	Club	Goals
1	(Puerto Rico) Marc Nieves	Academia Quintana	8
2	(Puerto Rico) Jeremy Roldan	Puerto Rico Sol FC	7
2	(Puerto Rico) Joseph Acevedo	Caguas Sporting FC	7
4	(Puerto Rico) Jan Carlos Mateo	Bayamon FC	6
4	(Puerto Rico) Luis Figueroa	Metropolitan FA	6
4	(Puerto Rico) Gerald Díaz	Academia Quintana	6
4	(Puerto Rico) Héctor Ramos	Metropolitan FA	6
7	(Puerto Rico) Jorge Rivera	Don Bosco FC	5
9	(Puerto Rico) Kevin Pagan	Academia Quintana	4
9	(Puerto Rico) Emmanuel Torres	Guayama FC	4

==== Top assists ====
Rank	Player	Club	Assists
1	(Puerto Rico) -	Metropolitan FA	0
2	(Puerto Rico) -	Metropolitan FA	0
3	(Puerto Rico) -	Bayamon FC	0
3	(Puerto Rico) -	Academia Quintana	0
3	(Puerto Rico) -	Bayamon FC	0

==== Clean sheets ====
Rank	Player	Club	Clean sheets	Avg.
1	(Puerto Rico) Joel Serrano	Academia Quintana	0	0.00

==== Hat-tricks ====
Player	For	Against	Result	Date	Round
(Puerto Rico) ---			0–0 (A)	March 1, 2024	0

(H) – Home; (A) – Away

=== Playoffs – Apertura 2023 ===
==== Semi-Finals ====
November 26, 2023
18:00 CST (UTC−6)

Metropolitan FA	3–2	Bayamon FC
Karlos Ferrer 21'; Héctor Ramos 62'; Karlos Ferrer 97'		Lisandro Abdiel Núñez Pérez 35'; Lisandro Abdiel Núñez Pérez 45+2'

Juan Cordero Dávila Stadium, San Juan
Referee: Janeishka Caban Rodríguez (Puerto Rico)
November 28, 2023
20:00 CST (UTC−6)

Academia Quintana	7–1	Caguas Sporting FC

Juan Cordero Dávila Stadium, San Juan
Referee: - (Puerto Rico)

==== Championship ====
December 2, 2023
20:00 CST (UTC−6)

Metropolitan FA	2–3	Academia Quintana
Julián Terron 61'; Héctor Ramos 67'		Marc Nieves 77'; Rodolfo Sulia 93'; Carlos Matos 110'

Estadio Centroamericano de Mayagüez, Mayagüez
Referee: José Raúl Torres Rivera (Puerto Rico)

LPR Champions
Academia Quintana
1st title
Livestream

== Torneo Clausura ==
=== League table ===
Pos	Team	Pld	W	D	L	GF	GA	GD	Pts
1	Academia Quintana	7	6	1	0	20	3	+17	19
2	Metropolitan FA	7	5	2	0	27	4	+23	17
3	Puerto Rico Sol FC	7	4	0	3	16	18	−2	12
4	Puerto Rico Surf SC	7	3	1	3	21	17	+4	10
5	Bayamón FC	7	3	1	3	17	13	+4	10
6	Caguas Sporting FC	7	3	1	3	20	17	+3	10
7	FC Mayagüez	7	1	0	6	5	20	−15	3
8	Guaynabo FC	7	0	0	7	3	37	−34	0

Clausura Team Changes
▲ Joining	▼ Leaving
FC Mayagüez	Don Bosco FC
Puerto Rico Surf FC	Guayama FC

=== Regular season statistics ===
==== Top goalscorers ====
Players sorted first by goals scored, then by last name.

Rank	Player	Club	Goals
1	(Puerto Rico) Kevin Hernández	Academia Quintana	10
2	(Puerto Rico) Ian Rodriguez	Caguas Sporting	9
3	(Puerto Rico) Jeremy Roldan	Puerto Rico Sol FC	6
4	(Puerto Rico) Hector Ramos	Metropolitan FA	5
4	(Puerto Rico) Gerald Díaz	Academia Quintana	5
4	(Puerto Rico) Adriel Gonzalez	Puerto Rico Surf SC	5
7	(Puerto Rico) Andres Suarez	Bayamon FC	4
7	(Puerto Rico) Jan Carlos Mateo	Bayamon FC	4
7	(Puerto Rico) Karlos Ferrer	Metropolitan FA	4
7	(Puerto Rico) Philip Hernandez	Puerto Rico Sol FC	4

==== Top assists ====
Rank	Player	Club	Assists
1	(Puerto Rico) Karlos Ferrer	Metropolitan FA	5
2	(Puerto Rico) Pedro Costantini	Metropolitan FA	3
3	(Puerto Rico) Sebastian Villafañe Rolon	Bayamon FC	2
3	(Puerto Rico) Juan Luis Eduardo Jose Cano Hernandez	Academia Quintana	2
3	(Argentina) Adrian Daniel Oviedo Bascardal	Bayamon FC	2

==== Clean sheets ====
Rank	Player	Club	Clean sheets	Avg.
1	(Puerto Rico) Joel Serrano	Academia Quintana	0	0.00

==== Hat-tricks ====
Player	For	Against	Result	Date	Round
(Puerto Rico) ---			0–0 (A)	March 1, 2024	0

(H) – Home; (A) – Away

=== Playoffs – Clausura 2024 ===
==== Semi-Finals ====
May 22, 2024
17:30 CST (UTC−6)

Metropolitan FA	1–0	Puerto Rico Sol FC
J. Vilela 58'	Report

Juan Cordero Dávila Stadium, San Juan
Referee: - (Puerto Rico)
May 22, 2024
20:30 CST (UTC−6)

Academia Quintana	3–0	Puerto Rico Surf SC
Joseph Marrero 13'; Gerald Díaz 64'; F. Berdasco 76'	Report

Juan Cordero Dávila Stadium, San Juan
Referee: - (Puerto Rico)

==== Championship ====
May 25, 2024
20:00 CST (UTC−6)

Academia Quintana	2–1	Metropolitan FA
Gerald Díaz 13'; A. Chaparro 38'	Report	M. Rivera 34'

Juan Ramon Loubriel Stadium, Bayamón
Referee: - (Puerto Rico)

LPR Champions
Academia Quintana
2nd title
Livestream
