= 2025–26 Liga Puerto Rico Pro season =

Liga Puerto Rico Pro
- Season: 2025–26
- Champions: Apertura: Academia Quintana (4th title); Clausura: Ponce FC (1st title)
- Matches: 206; Apertura: 93; Clausura: 113
- Biggest home win: Clausura: Puerto Rico Surf SC 24–0 FC Mayagüez (15 April 2026)

The 2025-26 Liga Puerto Rico Pro season was the seventh season of Liga Puerto Rico Pro, and the second under that name. It was the league's fourth season to be divided into two championships: the Apertura and the Clausura, each in an identical format and each contested by ten and eleven teams respectively. The season was played in a round robin style, with the top four 4 making the playoffs.

== Torneo Apertura 2025 ==
Statistics Statistics Page2

	Team	GP	W	D	L	GF	GA	GD	Pts.
1	Ponce FC	18	15	2	1	66	16	+50	46
2	Metropolitan FA	18	14	0	4	80	18	+62	42
3	Academia Quintana	18	13	3	2	88	27	+61	42
4	Puerto Rico Surf SC	18	12	1	5	61	18	+43	37
5	Caguas Sporting FC	18	12	0	6	65	28	+37	36
6	EF Taurinos de Cayey	18	7	2	9	36	34	+2	23
7	DS Edusoccer	18	4	1	13	24	80	-56	13
8	San Juan FC	18	3	2	13	27	73	-46	11
9	FC Mayagüez	18	3	1	14	24	111	-87	10
10	Guayama FC	18	1	1	16	10	76	-66	4

Apertura Changes
▲ Joining	▼ Leaving
Guayama FC	Caribe SC

=== Regular season statistics ===
==== Top goalscorers ====
Players sorted first by goals scored, then by last name.

Rank	Player	Club	Goals
1	(Puerto Rico) Jorge Rivera	Metropolitan FA	29
2	(Puerto Rico) Kevin Hernández	Puerto Rico Surf FC	19
3	(Puerto Rico) Kevin Torres	Academia Quintana	17
4	(Colombia) Jhonathan Rivas	Ponce FC	14
5	(Puerto Rico) Christian Vargas	Caguas Sporting FC	13
6	(Puerto Rico) Wilfredo Rivera	Academia Quintana	10
7	(Puerto Rico) Dante Williams	Ponce FC	8
7	(Puerto Rico) Héctor Ramos	Metropolitan FA	8
9	(Puerto Rico) Marc Nieves	Academia Quintana	7
9	(Puerto Rico) Joseph Villafane	Caguas Sporting FC	7

==== Top assists ====
Rank	Player	Club	Assists
1	(Puerto Rico) -	Metropolitan FA	0
2	(Puerto Rico) -	Metropolitan FA	0
3	(Puerto Rico) -	Bayamon FC	0
3	(Puerto Rico) -	Academia Quintana	0
3	(Puerto Rico) -	Bayamon FC	0

=== Playoffs ===
==== Semi-Finals ====
December 6, 2025
19:30 EST (UTC−5)

Ponce FC	1–2	Puerto Rico Surf SC
A. Selemani 5'		K. Hernandez 19'; D. Hernandez 64'

Juan Cordero Dávila Stadium, San Juan
Referee: - (Puerto Rico)
December 7, 2025
19:00 EST (UTC−5)

Metropolitan FA	0–1	Academia Quintana
		K. Torres 82'

Los Caobos, Ponce
Referee: - (Puerto Rico)

==== Championship ====
December 13, 2025
19:30 EST (UTC−5)

Academia Quintana	1–0	Puerto Rico Surf SC
K. Carr 19'

Juan Cordero Davila Stadium, San Juan
Referee: Janeishka Cabán (Puerto Rico)

LPR Pro Champions
Academia Quintana
4th title
Livestream

== Torneo Clausura 2026 ==
Statistics

	Team	GP	W	D	L	GF	GA	GD	Pts.
1	Academia Quintana	20	17	2	1	85	10	+75	53
2	Metropolitan FA	20	15	4	1	86	12	+74	49
3	Ponce FC	20	15	2	3	72	14	+58	47
4	Puerto Rico Surf SC	20	14	1	5	67	16	+51	43
5	Caguas Sporting FC	20	11	4	5	65	24	+41	37
6	San Juan FC	20	8	2	10	47	27	+20	26
7	DS Edusoccer	20	7	2	11	35	47	-12	23
8	EF Taurinos de Cayey	20	5	4	11	44	45	-1	19
9	Guayama FC	20	5	1	14	27	72	-45	16
10	Guaynabo FC	20	2	0	18	21	78	-57	6
11	FC Mayagüez	20	0	0	20	7	211	-204	0

Clausura Changes
▲ Joining	▼ Leaving
Guaynabo FC	None.

=== Regular season statistics ===
==== Top goalscorers ====
Players sorted first by goals scored, then by last name.

Rank	Player	Club	Goals
1	(Puerto Rico) Kevin Torres	Academia Quintana	27
2	(Puerto Rico) Jorge Rivera	Metropolitan FA	20
3	(Colombia) Christian Aragon	EF Taurinos de Cayey	16
4	(Puerto Rico) Dante Williams	Ponce FC	15
5	(Puerto Rico) Joel Burgos	Metropolitan FA	13
6	(Puerto Rico) Kevin Hernandez	Puerto Rico Surf FC	12
7	(Puerto Rico) Christian Vargas	Caguas Sporting FC	11
7	(Puerto Rico) Philip Hernández	Ponce FC	11
9	(Colombia) Jhonathon Rivas	Ponce FC	10
9	(Puerto Rico) Lorenzo Baez	Puerto Rico Surf FC	10

==== Top assists ====
Rank	Player	Club	Assists
1	(Puerto Rico) -	Metropolitan FA	0
2	(Puerto Rico) -	Metropolitan FA	0
3	(Puerto Rico) -	Bayamon FC	0
3	(Puerto Rico) -	Academia Quintana	0
3	(Puerto Rico) -	Bayamon FC	0

=== Playoffs ===
==== Bracket ====
Semifinals
June 6
Metropolitan FA	0 (3)
Ponce FC (p)	0 (4)
June 6
Academia Quintana(p)	0 (5)
Puerto Rico Surf SC	0 (3)

Final
June 13
Academia Quintana	1
Ponce FC	3

==== Semi-Finals ====
June 6, 2026
16:00 EST (UTC−5)

Metropolitan FA	0–0	Ponce FC
Penalties
M. Maroni (penalty missed); L. Martinez (penalty scored); G. Ocampo (penalty scored); M. Martinez (penalty scored); E. Marquez (penalty missed)	3–4	E. Guzman (penalty scored); D. Williams (penalty scored); D. Martinez (penalty scored); S. Acosta (penalty missed); M. Francois (penalty scored)

Parque Reparto Metropolitano, San Juan
Referee: - (Puerto Rico)
June 6, 2026
20:30 EST (UTC−5)

Academia Quintana	0–0	Puerto Rico Surf SC
Penalties
J. Rivera (penalty scored); R. Rivera (penalty scored); D. Palacios (penalty scored); T. Fernandez (penalty scored); M. Nieves (penalty scored)	5–3	C. Velazquez (penalty scored); R. Lopez (penalty missed); A. Fiasca (penalty scored); L. Baez (penalty scored)

Juan Cordero Dávila Stadium, San Juan
Referee: Janeishka Cabán(Puerto Rico)

==== Championship ====
June 13, 2026
20:00 EST (UTC−5)

Academia Quintana	1–3	Ponce FC
Ricardo Rivera 44'		Dante Williams 13'; Jhonathon Rivas 81'; Tomás Fernadez (og) 87'

Bayamon Soccer Complex, Bayamón
Referee: - (Puerto Rico)

LPR Pro Champions
Ponce FC
1st title
Livestream

== End of season awards ceremony ==
The award ceremony had taken place at the Distrito T-Mobile on December 18, 2025.

- Top Scorer: Jorge L. Rivera - Metropolitan FA
- Few Goals Conceded: Philip Reis - Ponce FC
- Best Coach:
- Best Player:

== Supercopa 2026 ==
The final will be played between the winners of both seasons; Academia Quintana and Ponce FC. The game was played on November 4, 2026.

November 4, 2026
19:00 EST (UTC−5)

Academia Quintana	2-0	Ponce FC
Adrian Diaz Faísca 54'; Dante Williams 88' (pen.)	Report

Estadio Centroamericano, Mayagüez
Referee: - (Puerto Rico)

Academia Quintana
Ponce FC

TBD
GK	1	(Puerto Rico) Joel Serrano	Substituted off Substituted on
DF	TBD	(Puerto Rico) Rayson Rosario
DF	TBD	(Puerto Rico) Rodulfo Sulia
DF	TBD	(Argentina) Tomas Fernandez
DF	TBD	(Puerto Rico) Kendall Pellot
MF	TBD	(Puerto Rico) Gianfranco Capanelli
MF	TBD	(Puerto Rico) Juan O'Neill
MF	TBD	(Puerto Rico) Carlos Yosuan
MF	TBD	(Puerto Rico) Dante Williams 88' (pen.)
MF	TBD	(Puerto Rico) Ricardo Rivera
FW	TBD	(Puerto Rico) Adrian Diaz Faisca	54'
Substitutes:
GK	TBD	(Puerto Rico) Yoksan Rosario		(substituted on) 44'
DF	TBD	(Puerto Rico) Lorenzo Baez
DF	TBD	(Puerto Rico) Torres
DF	TBD	(Puerto Rico) Pulga
MF	TBD	(Puerto Rico) Bermudez
MF	TBD	(Puerto Rico) Jan Luis Rivera		Substituted on
DF	TBD	(Puerto Rico) Adrian Soto
DF	TBD	(Puerto Rico) Ricardo Rojas
DF	TBD	(Puerto Rico) Ian Martinez	Substituted on
Manager:
(Puerto Rico) Elismael Ortiz

TBD
GK	3	(Puerto Rico) Wilson Muñoz
DF	5	(Colombia) Edgar Guzmán
DF	2	(Haiti) Mandell François
DF	21	(Puerto Rico) Mike Hernandez
MF	10	(Argentina) Teo Candido
MF	14	(United States) Collin Scarbrough
MF	18	(Honduras) Geovanny Bueso
MF	20	(United States) Sebastián Monroy
MF	7	(Colombia) Cristian Aragon
MF	29	(Mexico) Rigoberto Najera
FW	30	(Puerto Rico) Philip Hernández
Substitutes:
GK	TBD	(Puerto Rico) TBD		(substituted on) 44'
MF	'TBD	(Puerto Rico) TBD		Substituted on
MF	TBD	(Puerto Rico) TBD		Substituted on
DF	TBD	(Puerto Rico) TBD	Substituted on
DF	TBD	(Puerto Rico) TBD	Substituted on
Manager:
(Mexico) David Martinez

Supercopa LPR
Academia Quintana
1st title
Livestream
