= Lucas Bellomo =

Nicaraguan footballer

Personal information
- Full name: Lucas Bellomo Vélez
- Date of birth: 10 January 2006 (age 20)
- Place of birth: Miami, United States
- Height: 5 ft 11 in (1.80 m)
- Position: Forward

Team information
- Current team: Ponce FC
- Number: 14

Youth career
- –2024: IMG Academy
- 2025–2026: Diriangén FC

Senior career*
Years	Team	Apps	(Gls)
2025–2026	Diriangén FC	1	(1)
2026–	Ponce FC	11	(3)
- * Club domestic league appearances and goals

Lucas Bellomo (born 10 January 2006) is an Nicaraguan professional footballer who currently plays for Ponce FC of the Liga Puerto Rico Pro. Born in the United States, he has represented Nicaragua at the youth international level.

== Club career ==
As a youth, Bellomo was part of the IMG Academy in Bradenton, Florida. In 2025, he moved to the academy of Diriangén FC of Nicaragua's Liga Primera. In early 2025, he was called up to the senior team for the first time for a match against Deportivo Ocotal on 24 February because of a number of injuries in the squad. He went on to make his professional debut in the match, coming on as a second-half substitute, and scored his first senior goal in the eventual 5–0 victory.

In January 2026, Bellomo was announced as a new signing for Ponce FC of the Liga Puerto Rico Pro ahead of the 2026 Clausura. The club advanced to the tournament final against Academia Quintana with Bellomo scoring in the 3–1 victory to win the club's first-ever national championship.

== International career ==
Born in the United States, Bellomo is also eligible to represent Argentina and Nicaragua through his father and mother, respectively. He represented Nicaragua at the youth level in the 2023 CONCACAF U-17 Championship and 2024 CONCACAF U-20 Championship qualifying.
