= FC Mayagüez =

Professional association football team based in Puerto Rico

- Full name: Futbol Club Mayagüez
- Nickname: Indios (Indians)
- Founded: 2004; 22 years ago
- Ground: Estadio Centroamericano de Mayagüez
- Capacity: 12,175
- Chairman: (Puerto Rico) Gladys Cusy
- Manager: (Puerto Rico) Gladys Cusy
- League: Liga Puerto Rico Pro
- 2026 Clausura: Regular Season: 11th
| Home colors | Away colors |

Fútbol Club Mayagüez is a Puerto Rican professional association football team that plays in Mayagüez. They currently play in the Liga Puerto Rico Pro. Their home stadium is the Estadio Centroamericano de Mayagüez. They were founded in 2004.

== Kit History ==
Kit sponsorship
| Kit supplier | Period | Ref. |
|---|---|---|
| (Spain) Joma | 2025 | |

== Current squad ==
February 16, 2026 Note: Flags indicate national team as defined under FIFA eligibility rules; some limited exceptions apply. Players may hold more than one non-FIFA nationality.

| No. | Pos. | Nation | Player |
|---|---|---|---|
| 40 | GK | PUR | Luis Rivera |
| 8 | DF | COL | Daniel Zuñiga |
| 10 | MF | PUR | Francisco Rodríguez |

| No. | Pos. | Nation | Player |
|---|---|---|---|
| 21 | MF | PUR | José Arenas |
| 23 | DF | PUR | Gonzalo Aranibar |
| 11 | EI | PUR | Nahir Vazquez |
| 6 | MF | PUR | Ignacio Negron |

== Rivalries ==
FC Mayagüez has a rivalry with DS Edusoccer. The derby is named “El Derbi Mayagüezano”

== Club hierarchy ==
Mayagüez Ltd.

Chairman: Gladys Cusy

Mayagüez plc.

Vice President : Gustavo Vargas

Club treasure : Cristina Vargas

Club Secretary : Eddie Casiano

== Achievements ==
| Year | Position |
|---|---|
| 2010 | 2nd (GroupA) |
| 2011 | 5th |
| 2017 | |

=== Year-by-year ===
| Season | PRSL | | | | | | | | | Playoffs | CFU Club Championship | Top goalscorer | | Managers |
| Season | Div. | Pos. | Pl. | W | D | L | GS | GA | P | Playoffs | CFU Club Championship | Name | League | Managers |
|---|---|---|---|---|---|---|---|---|---|---|---|---|---|---|
| 2015 | 1st | 4th | 10 | 6 | 3 | 1 | 28 | 15 | 21 | - | Did not enter | (Puerto Rico) | - | (Puerto Rico) |
| 2016 | Apertura | 12th | 13 | 2 | 1 | 10 | 12 | 49 | 7 | 12th | Did not enter | (Puerto Rico) | | (Puerto Rico) |
| 2016 | Clausura | 6th | 10 | 5 | 0 | 5 | 24 | 27 | 15 | 6th | Did not enter | (Puerto Rico) | | (Puerto Rico) |
| 2017 | 1st | 6th | 9 | 4 | 0 | 5 | 36 | 32 | 12 | DNQ | Did not enter | (Puerto Rico) | - | (Puerto Rico) |
| Season | LPR Pro | | | | | | | | | Playoffs | CFU Club Championship | Top goalscorer | | Managers |
| Season | Div. | Pos. | Pl. | W | D | L | GS | GA | P | Playoffs | CFU Club Championship | Name | League | Managers |
| 2018-19 | 1st | 8th | 21 | 3 | 2 | 16 | 27 | 82 | 11 | DNQ | Did not enter | (Puerto Rico) | - | (Puerto Rico) |
| 2019-20 | 1st | 5th | 16 | 8 | 3 | 5 | 43 | 19 | 27 | DNQ | Did not enter | (Puerto Rico) José I. González | 18 | (Puerto Rico) |
| 2020-21 | 1st | Season Cancelled due to COVID-19 | | | | | | | | | | | | (Puerto Rico) |
| 2021 | 1st | Went On Hiatus | | | | | | | | | | | | |
| 2022 | 1st | 8th | 14 | 0 | 1 | 13 | 3 | 66 | 1 | DNQ | Did not enter | (Puerto Rico) | - | (Puerto Rico) |
| 2022-23 | Apertura | Went On Hiatus | | | | | | | | | | | | |
| 2022-23 | Clausura | 5th | 5 | 1 | 2 | 3 | 3 | 6 | 5 | DNQ | Did not enter | (Puerto Rico) | - | (Puerto Rico) |
| 2023-24 | Apertura | Went On Hiatus | | | | | | | | | | | | |
| 2023-24 | Clausura | 7th | 7 | 1 | 0 | 6 | 5 | 20 | 3 | DNQ | Did not enter | (Puerto Rico) | - | (Puerto Rico) |
| 2024-25 | Apertura | 7th | 9 | 2 | 4 | 3 | 16 | 26 | 10 | DNQ | Did not enter | (Colombia) Jhonathan Rivas | 9 | (Puerto Rico) |
| 2024-25 | Clausura | 9th | 18 | 2 | 3 | 13 | 28 | 65 | 9 | DNQ | Did not enter | (Colombia) Jhonathan Rivas | 17 | (Puerto Rico) |
| 2025-26 | Apertura | 9th | 18 | 3 | 1 | 14 | 24 | 111 | 10 | DNQ | Did not enter | (Puerto Rico) | - | (Puerto Rico) |
| 2025-26 | Clausura | 11th | 20 | 0 | 0 | 20 | 7 | 211 | 0 | DNQ | Did not enter | (Puerto Rico) | - | (Puerto Rico) |
| 2026-27 | Apertura | On Hiatus | | | | | | | | | To be decided. | (Puerto Rico) | - | (Puerto Rico) |
| 2026-27 | Clausura | - | - | - | - | - | - | - | - | - | To be decided. | (Puerto Rico) | - | (Puerto Rico) |

== Liga Nacional ==
Lost their first game 6–2 to Academia Quintana.
