= Guayama FC =

Association football club in Puerto Rico

Guayama Fútbol Club
- Full name: Guayama Fútbol Club
- Nicknames: Los Brujos (The Witches); Los Brujos del Guamaní (The Witches of Guayama).
- Founded: 1959; 67 years ago
- Stadium: Pista de Atletismo Dr. Roberto Monroig; Guayama, Puerto Rico
- Capacity: 1,500
- Chairman: Milton Ortiz
- Manager: Johnattan Pérez
- League: Liga Puerto Rico Pro
- 2026 Clausura: Regular Season: 9th
- Website: http://www.guayamafc.com
Home colors	Away colors

Guayama Fútbol Club is a Puerto Rican professional Association football club based in Guayama, Puerto Rico. Founded in 1959, the club currently plays in the Liga Puerto Rico Pro, the first division of Puerto Rico. The club plays at the Pista de Atletismo Dr. Roberto Monroig.

== History ==
The club was founded in 1959 as an amateur team, before later becoming a professional club. The club joined the premier division of Puerto Rican football, the Liga Nacional de Fútbol de Puerto Rico, in 2012. The club has won 11 national titles and is one of the most historic football clubs in Puerto Rico. The club won their first league title in the 1963/64 season under the name of Interguayames FC. After that they won the league in 1971, 1974, 1976, 1977, 1981, 1982, 1983, 1985, 1987, and 1991 under the name of Guayama FC. Additionally Guayama FC has a youth academy that currently participates in the PRS Sur.

The club was selected to participate internationally in the 1992 CONCACAF Champions' Cup against Rockmaster FC of the U.S. Virgin Islands, but withdrew before the tournament began.

Their stadium is the Pista de Atletismo Dr. Roberto Monroig used exclusively for football and athletics with a capacity of 1,500 spectators. Once the Guayama Football Stadium is built Guayama FC will be able to use the new stadium. The capacity of the Guayama Football Stadium will be between 1,500 to 2,000 spectators.

== Participation in Concacaf competitions ==
- Concacaf Champions' Cup : 1 appearance

1992 - The club was going to participate against Rockmaster FC but withdrew and therefore didn’t play the match in the Caribbean Group 2 Preliminary Round.

== Stadium ==
- Pista de Atletismo Dr. Roberto Monroig; Guayama, Puerto Rico (19** – present)
- Guayama FC Stadium; Guayama, Puerto Rico (Under Construction)

== Current squad ==
Current roster updated on February 11, 2026 .

Note: Flags indicate national team as defined under FIFA eligibility rules; some limited exceptions apply. Players may hold more than one non-FIFA nationality.

No.	Pos.	Nation	Player
1	GK	PUR	Angel Torres
15	DF	PUR	Dylan Tosado
5	DF	PUR	Diego Zanabria
14	DF	PUR	Jose Gautier
4	DF	PUR	Gilberto Fraticceli
21	DF	PUR	Andinson Núñez
———	DF	PUR	Marco Trípode
———	DF	PUR	Pablo Pérez
———	DF	PUR	Sebastian León
———	W	PUR	Anakin Purcell
17	W	PUR	Diego Crespo

No.	Pos.	Nation	Player
———	W	PUR	Edgar Santiago
———	W	PUR	Lee Beltrán
23	MF	PUR	Germán Morales (Captain)
———	MF	PUR	Roberto de León
———	MF	COL	José Prado
———	MF	PUR	Jhoneykel Villalba
17	FW	PUR	Diego Santana
———	ST	PUR	Eiden Díaz
—			
—			
—			

Club Manager: Milton Ortiz

Technical Director: Elimagdier Amaro

== Domestic history ==
=== LPR PRO ===
Key

Champion Runners-up 3rd Place

Season	League							Play-offs	Notes
Season	Div.	Pos.	Pl.	W	D	L	Pts.	Play-offs	Notes
2025-26 Apertura	1st	10th	18	1	1	16	4	DNQ	
2025-26 Clausura	1st	9th	20	5	1	14	16	DNQ	

Season	LPR Pro									Playoffs	CFU Club Championship	Top goalscorer		Managers
Season	Div.	Pos.	Pl.	W	D	L	GS	GA	P	Playoffs	CFU Club Championship	Name	League	Managers
2018-19	1st	4th	21	11	2	8	50	44	35	Semi-finals	Did not enter	(Puerto Rico) José I. González	20	(Puerto Rico)
2019-20	1st	Went On Hiatus												
2020-21	1st	Season Cancelled due to COVID-19												(Puerto Rico)
2021	1st	Went On Hiatus												
2022	1st	Went On Hiatus												
2022-23	Apertura	Went On Hiatus												
2022-23	Clausura	Went On Hiatus												
2023-24	Apertura	3rd	7	4	1	2			13	DNE	Did not enter	(Puerto Rico) Emmanuel Torres	4	(Puerto Rico)
2023-24	Clausura	Went On Hiatus												
2024-25	Apertura	Went On Hiatus												
2024-25	Clausura	Went On Hiatus												
2025-26	Apertura	10th	18	1	1	16	10	76	4	DNQ	Did not enter	(Puerto Rico)	-	(Puerto Rico)
2025-26	Clausura	9th	20	5	1	14	27	72	16	DNQ	Did not enter	(Puerto Rico)	-	(Puerto Rico)
2026-27	Apertura	Went On Hiatus												
2026-27	Clausura	Went On Hiatus												
