= Ciudad Deportiva Millito Navarro =

Multi-sport complex in Puerto Rico

Coordinates: 18.00363°N 66.58462°W

- Interactive map of Ciudad Deportiva Millito Navarro
- Full name: Ciudad Deportiva Millito Navarro
- Location: Ponce, Puerto Rico
- Owner: Government of the Autonomous Municipality of Ponce, Puerto Rico
- Operator: Ponce, Puerto Rico, Municipal Government
- Field size: 1,000,000 square feet; 25 cuerdas

Construction
- Groundbreaking: 2012
- Built: Construction started 10 May 2012.
- Opened: Under construction
- Cost: $32.3 Million USD
- Project manager: Gutberto Vega (Resident Engineer)
- General contractor: GVG Builders
- Main contractor: Lorraine Construction

The Ciudad Deportiva Millito Navarro (Millito Navarro Sports City) is a multi-sport complex currently under construction in Ponce, Puerto Rico. As of August 2026, the project is still paused, but the sports field remain in use.

The complex is to consist of a soccer stadium, a baseball field, three tennis courts, a track for track and field, a covered basketball court, and a covered gymnasium. It is also planned to have schooling, physical training, and medical facilities on the premises. Its projected cost is 32.3 million USD. The complex is named after Ponce's Millito Navarro, the first Puerto Rican to play baseball in the Negro leagues and who, living until age 105, was also the oldest living professional baseball player to have played in the Negro leagues.

== Description and location ==
Ciudad Deportiva is being built in an area of over 1 million square feet of land, between Urbanizacion Los Caobos and Caminos del Sur. It is to consist of a soccer stadium, a baseball field, three tennis courts, a track for track and field sports, a covered gymnasium, and covered handball courts. In addition it is planned to have a sports academy, the first one of its kind in Puerto Rico. Other facilities are to include a central plaza, a medical sports clinic, and facilities for martial arts. Ciudad Deportiva will be located in Ponce's Barrio Bucana, next to Polideportivo Frankie Colón at Urbanizacion Los Caobos.

== History ==
The idea for Ciudad Deportiva was one of five ideas that Mayor Maria Melendez Altieri had for permanent structures for Ponce during her administration. She called the five ideas the "emblematic" projects of her administration and dubbed the overall plan "Ponce Avanza" (Ponce Moves Forward). The original plan judged the initial cost of the Ciudad Deportiva at $4.5 million initially. In 2010, the mayor's plan for Ciudad Deportiva was presented before the Puerto Rico Senate. In early 2012 the first payment of $1,050,000 was made to CGC Builders to start construction work.

== Purpose ==
The purpose of the complex is to "provide ... sports facilities in the city of Ponce for the celebration of sporting events lasting more than one day".

== Funding ==
In February 2012, the sports campus has an initial projected total cost of $20 million USD. The municipality has secured US$6.3 million to start construction. In January 2012, the municipality of Ponce adjudicated US$1.05 million to GCG Builders to level the ground to commence the first phase of construction. This was revised in May 2012 to $32.3 million USD.

== Construction phases ==
The Sports City will be developed in phases. Phase I will include construction of the three tennis courts and an area for extreme sports, including skateboarding. Phase II will encompass the baseball field, the track and field area, soccer field, and the central plaza. A future phase yet would include the soccer stadium. The skateboarding facility opened on 23 March 2013. By October 2013, building of the soccer field (Spanish: cancha de fútbol) had already started.

== Los Caobos Sports Center ==
Los Caobos Sports Center
- Interactive map of Los Caobos Sports Center
- Full name: Polideportivo Los Caobos; Parque de Fútbol Los Caobos
- Location: Ponce, Puerto Rico

Tenant
- Ponce FC (LPR) (2025-present)

The Polideportivo Los Caobos (Los Caobos Sports Center) is a soccer stadium in the Ciudad Deportiva Millito Navarro multi-sport complex in Ponce, Puerto Rico.

Owned and operated by the municipal government of Ponce, the stadium serves as home field for Ponce FC, a Puerto Rican soccer club based in Ponce who have used it as their home since 2025.

=== Notable events ===
==== Supercopa LPR PRO ====
CFU Club Shield Qualifier
Season	Apertura Winner	Clausura Winner	Game Date	Location	SuperCopa Winner	Result
2024–25	Academia Quintana	Metropolitan FA	November 19, 2025	Ponce, Puerto Rico	Metropolitan FA	3—0
