= Ponce FC =

Association football club in Puerto Rico

- Full name: Ponce Fútbol Club
- Founded: February 13, 2025; 21 months ago
- Ground: Los Caobos Sports Center
- Capacity: 1,000
- Chairman: Lucas Medina
- Manager: David Martinez
- League: Liga Puerto Rico Pro
- 2026 Clausura: Regular Season: 3rd Playoff: Champions
- Website: facebook.com
Home colors	Away colors

Ponce FC is a Puerto Rican association football club based in Ponce that currently plays in the Liga Puerto Rico Pro.

== History ==
Ponce had lost its importance in the Puerto Rico football community after the departure of Club Atlético River Plate Puerto Rico and FC Leones caused the city to lack a professional club. Ponce FC was announced as a new team for the Liga Puerto Rico on February 13, 2025 in the city's Plaza del Caribe. At that time, the team's roster, uniforms, and details of its sporting plan were unveiled. Lucas Medina and Ulises Clavell were announced as the club's first co-managers. At the time, Clavell stated that the club was a serious project with the intent to strengthen the league and provide opportunities for players from southern Puerto Rico.

In the 2025-26 Clausura playoffs, the club defeated Metropolitan FA in the semi-finals to advance to the finals for the first time in club history. Ponce FC went on to defeat Academia Quintana 3–1 in the final to win the club's first-ever national championship.

=== Kit History ===
Kit sponsorship
Kit supplier	Period	Sponsor	Ref.
(Puerto Rico) Esh Sport	2025-present	Auto Mull AutoPonceno	

== Stadium ==
The club plays its home matches at the Los Caobos Sports Center which features a FIFA-sized pitch. The stadium is part of the Ciudad Deportiva Millito Navarro. In November 2024, the local government announced that the field would receive upgrades including an artificial turf surface and drainage with work expected to be complete in early 2025. The venue became the first football pitch with an artificial surface in the city's history.

== Domestic history ==
Key

Champion Runners-up 3rd Place

=== Year-by-year ===
Season	LPR Pro									Playoffs	CFU Club Championship	Top goalscorer		Managers
Season	Div.	Pos.	Pl.	W	D	L	GS	GA	P	Playoffs	CFU Club Championship	Name	League	Managers
2024-25	Clausura	6th	18	7	1	10	27	35	22	DNQ	Did not enter	(Puerto Rico)	-	(Puerto Rico) Jahaziel Acosta
2025-26	Apertura	1st	18	15	2	1	66	16	46	Semi-finals	Did not enter	(Colombia) Jhonathan Rivas	14	(Argentina) Walter Zermatten
2025-26	Clausura	3rd	20	15	2	3	72	14	47	1st	Did not enter	(Puerto Rico) Dante Williams	15	(Puerto Rico) Jahaziel Acosta
2026-27	Apertura	-							-	-	To be decided.	(Puerto Rico)	-	(Mexico) David Martínez
2026-27	Clausura	-	-	-	-	-	-	-	-	-	To be decided.	(Puerto Rico)	-	(Mexico) David Martínez

== Current squad ==
As of 14 September 2026

Note: Flags indicate national team as defined under FIFA eligibility rules; some limited exceptions apply. Players may hold more than one non-FIFA nationality.

No.	Pos.	Nation	Player
1	GK	PUR	Emilio Martínez
12	GK	VIR	Whelan Joseph
2	DF	HAI	Mandell François
3	DF	USA	Christopher Saeteros
4	DF	CIV	Dominique Kosséhassé
19	DF	USA	Diego Martinez
21	DF	USA	Mike Hernández
33	DF	USA	Wilson Muñoz
5	MF	USA	Edgar Guzmán (captain)
7	FW	USA	Christian Aragón

No.	Pos.	Nation	Player
8	MF	USA	Jason Chunchi
10	MF	USA	Teo Candido
11	MF	ENG	Famade Bamba
16	MF	USA	Aria Aminloo
17	MF	PUR	Jean González
20	MF	USA	Sebastián Monroy
22	MF	PUR	José Gautier
29	MF	MEX	Rigoberto Najera
9	FW	FRA	Karl Mbouombouo
15	FW	USA	Fabrizio Bustamante
18	FW	HON	Geovanny Bueso

== Achievements ==
Liga Puerto Rico Pro

- Season Champions (1): 2025-26 Apertura
- Playoff Champions (1): 2025-26 Clausura
