= San Juan FC =

Association football club in Puerto Rico

- Full name: San Juan Fútbol Club
- Founded: 2011; 15 years ago
- Ground: Parque de Futbol Benjamin Martinez Gonzalez
- Capacity: 1,000
- Chairman: Ricardo Dip
- Manager: Daniel Galindo
- League: Liga Puerto Rico Pro
- 2026 Clausura: Regular Season: 6th
- Website: sanjuanfc.com

San Juan FC is a Puerto Rican association football club based in San Juan that currently plays in the Liga Puerto Rico Pro. The club also fields youth sides.

== Kit History ==
Kit sponsorship
Kit supplier	Period	Sponsor	Ref.
(Spain) Joma	2024-2025	Fubol Mania	
(Puerto Rico)	2026-present	Universal Insurance PR	

== Domestic history ==
Key

Champion Runners-up 3rd Place

Season	League							Play-Offs	Manager
Season	Div.	Pos.	GP.	W	D	L	Pts.	Play-Offs	Manager
2024–25 Apertura	1st	5th	9	4	1	4	13	DNQ	(Puerto Rico) Ricardo Dip
2024–25 Clausura	1st	4th	18	9	1	8	28	Not held	(Puerto Rico) Ricardo Dip
2025-26 Apertura	1st	8th	18	3	2	13	11	DNQ	(Puerto Rico) Daniel Galindo
2025-26 Clausura	1st	6th	20	8	2	10	26	DNQ	(Puerto Rico) Daniel Galindo
2026-27 Apertura	1st								(Puerto Rico) Daniel Galindo

== Current squad ==
As of October 27, 2026

Note: Flags indicate national team as defined under FIFA eligibility rules; some limited exceptions apply. Players may hold more than one non-FIFA nationality.

No.	Pos.	Nation	Player
—	GK	USA	James Anderson
—	GK	PUR	Juan Bustamante
—	GK	PUR	Julian Sandoval
—	DF	USA	Nicholas Greene
—	DF	PUR	Miguel Miranda
—	DF	PUR	Andres Bartolomei
—	DF	USA	William Fatzinger
—	DF	PUR	Jose Vazquez
—	DF	PUR	Daniel Morales
—	DF	PUR	Alexis Chaparro
—	DF	ARG	Lucas Martinez

No.	Pos.	Nation	Player
—	MF	PUR	Jorge Rosa
—	MF	PUR	Enrique Torres
—	MF	PUR	John Curte
—	MF	PUR	Diego Torres
—	MF	PUR	Steven Velez
—	MF	PUR	Adrian Prado
—	MF	PUR	Alejandro Vivoni
—	MF	PUR	Carter Laatsch
—	MF	PUR	Ian Rodriguez
—	FW	PUR	Jan Mateo
—	FW	PUR	Jeremy Roldan
19	FW	PUR	Javier Hopgood
—	FW	PUR	Carlos Matos
—	FW	PUR	Pancho Berdasco
—	FW	PUR	Sergio Rodriguez
—	FW	PUR	Emmanuel Espinal
—	FW	VEN	Adrian Quintero
—	FW	PUR	Diego Ramos
—	FW	PUR	Dennis Beltré
