= Puerto Rico Sol FC =

Puerto Rican association football club from Mayagüez

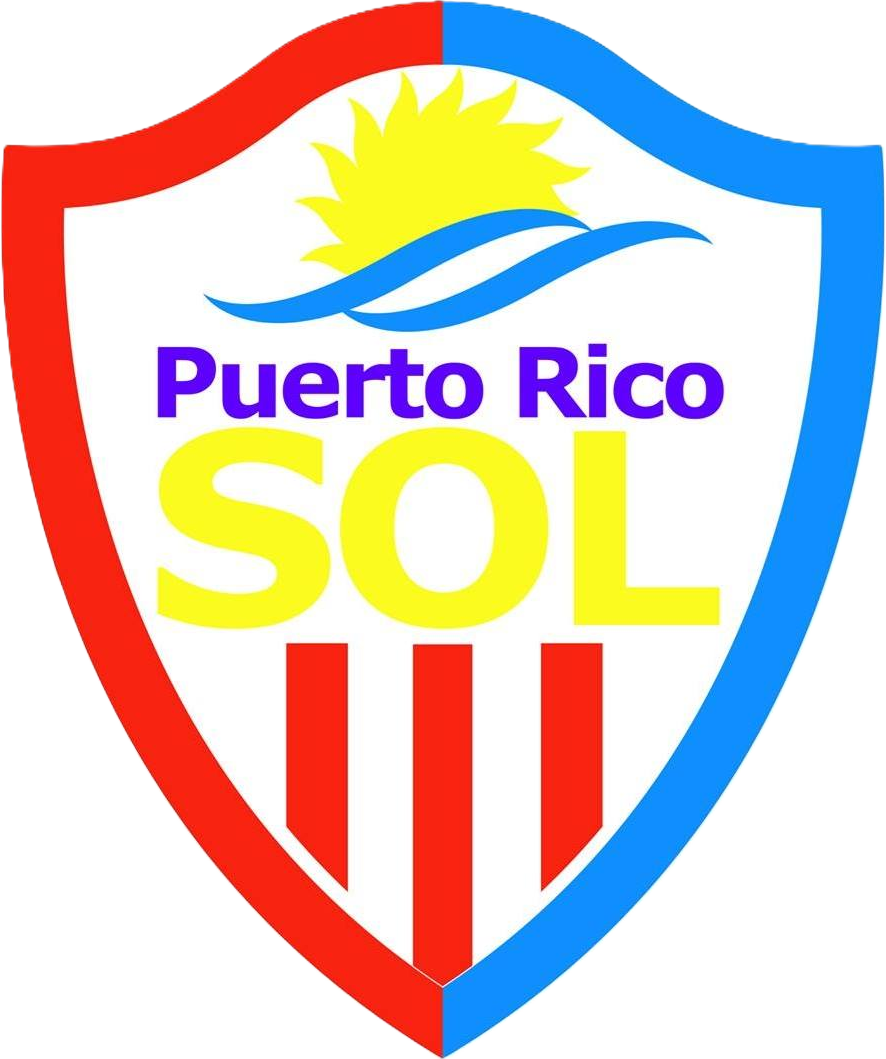
- Full name: Puerto Rico Sol Fútbol Club
- Founded: 2017; 9 years ago
- Dissolved: 2024
- Stadium: Estadio Centroamericano de Mayagüez
- Capacity: 12,175
- Chairman: Archie Álvarez
- Manager: Shek Borkowski
- League: Liga Puerto Rico Pro
- 2024 Apertura: Regular Season: 8th
Home colors	Away colors

Puerto Rico Sol FC was a Puerto Rican association football club from Mayagüez that played in the Liga Puerto Rico, later to be renamed to Liga Puerto Rico Pro. The highest level of football in Puerto Rico. After the end of the 2024 Apertura season the club announced that it would not return the next season and therefore it disappeared.

== History ==
Puerto Rico Sol FC was founded in 2016 by Shek Borkowski with Jose Luis Perez Torres joining in 2018. Borkowski, a native of Poland, also previously co-founded FC Indiana and Chicago Red Stars. The club joined the nascent Liga Puerto Rico for the 2018/2019 season.

== Stadium ==
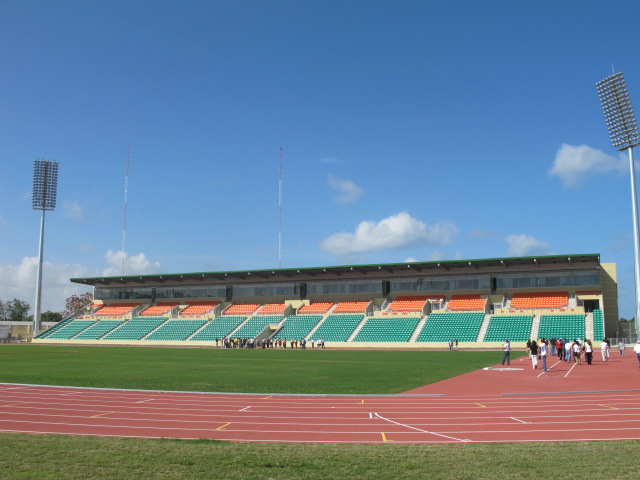
Mayagüez Athletics Stadium, the club's current venue

For the 2018-19 Liga Puerto Rico season, Sol played its home matches at the 4,000-seat Fajardo Soccer Stadium in Fajardo.

In May 2019 Sol FC signed a contract with the city of Mayagüez to play its home matches at the Mayagüez Athletics Stadium. As part of the deal, Sol FC would have the right to exclusive use of the stadium through 2023. The stadium is owned by the city of Mayagüez and has a capacity of 12,175 with 5,100 of those being roofed seats. It was constructed to host the athletics and soccer games of the 2010 Central American and Caribbean Games.

== Past squad ==
As of 10 October 2022.

Note: Flags indicate national team as defined under FIFA eligibility rules; some limited exceptions apply. Players may hold more than one non-FIFA nationality.

No.	Pos.	Nation	Player
1	GK	PUR	Gian Carlos Flores
2	DF	PUR	Gabi Valentin
3	DF	PUR	Alex Chaparro
4	DF	PUR	Luis Rosario
5	DF	USA	Matt Liotta
6	DF	PUR	Andres Cabrera
7	MF	PUR	Carlos Matos
8	DF	PUR	Siro Guitierrez
9	FW	PUR	Kevin Torres
10	MF	PUR	Fernando Guzman
11	MF	PUR	Christian Castro
12	MF	PUR	Sebastian Acevedo
16	DF	PUR	Emmanuel Torres
14	MF	PUR	Andres Ramos
15	MF	PUR	Jeremy Roldan

No.	Pos.	Nation	Player
13	MF	HON	Johnny Mejia
17	MF	PUR	Enrique Ramirez
18	DF	USA	Ben Watson
19	MF	USA	Jayden Perry
20	MF	PUR	Ian Marcos Rodriguez
21	MF	USA	Joe Garcia
22	GK	PUR	Axel Burgos
23	FW	PUR	Sebastian Soto Vega
24	MF	PUR	Yan Toro
25	MF	PUR	Jezrel Garcia
26	FW	PUR	Kevin Pagan
27	MF	ENG	Mitchell McPike
28	FW	PUR	Kevin Muniz
30	DF	PUR	TBA
31	GK	PUR	Luis Cubillan

== Domestic history ==
Key

Champion Runners-up 3rd Place

=== Year-by-year ===
Season	LPR Pro									Playoffs	CFU Club Championship	Top goalscorer		Managers
Season	Div.	Pos.	Pl.	W	D	L	GS	GA	P	Playoffs	CFU Club Championship	Name	League	Managers
2019-20	-	10th	16	5	1	10	23	41	16	Cancelled	Did not enter	(Puerto Rico)	-	(Puerto Rico)
2020-21	Season Cancelled due to COVID-19													(Puerto Rico)
2021	-	2nd	6	5	0	1	19	9	15	Semi-finals	Did not enter	(Puerto Rico)	-	(Puerto Rico)
2022	-	3rd	14	8	4	2	31	15	28	2nd	Did not enter	(Puerto Rico)	-	(Puerto Rico)
2022-23	Apertura	2nd	8	5	1	2	12	10	16	2nd	Did not enter	(Puerto Rico)	-	(Puerto Rico)
2022-23	Clausura	3rd	5	2	1	2	5	6	7	Semi-finals	Did not enter	(Puerto Rico)	-	(Puerto Rico)
2023-24	Apertura	4th	7	3	1	3			10	DNE	Did not enter	(Puerto Rico) Jeremy Roldan	7	(Puerto Rico)
2023-24	Clausura	3rd	7	4	0	3	16	18	12	Semi-finals	Did not enter	(Puerto Rico) Jeremy Roldan	6	(Puerto Rico)
2024-25	Apertura	8th	9	3	1	5	9	29	10	DNQ	Did not enter	(Puerto Rico)	-	(Puerto Rico)
2024-25	Clausura	Went On Hiatus												
