= 2017 Metropolitan FA season =

Metropolitan FA
2017 season
- President: Eva R. González
- Head Coach: Jorge Silvetti
- Stadium: Reparto Metropolitano Stadium
- Highest home attendance: League:
- Lowest home attendance: League:
- Average home league attendance: League:

The 2017 Metropolitan FA season is the club's third season of existence. The club will play in the Puerto Rico Soccer League, the first tier of the Puerto Rico soccer pyramid.

== Transfers ==
=== In ===
Date	Position	Nationality	Name	From	Fee	Ref.
	FW	(Puerto Rico)			Undisclosed	

=== Out ===
Date	Position	Nationality	Name	To	Fee	Ref.
		(Puerto Rico)			Undisclosed	

== Competitions ==
=== Bayamon Cup ===
The 2017 Metropolitan FA team announced the A team will be participating in the Bayamon City Cup.

=== Don Bosco Cup ===
The 2017 Metropolitan FA team announced the B team will be participating in the Don Bosco Cup.

==== Matches ====
February 5, 2017 1	Metropolitan FA - B	0–1	Athletic de San Juan	San Juan
7:00 PM				Attendance: --

February 7, 2017 2	Metropolitan FA - B	0–3	GPS Puerto Rico	San Juan
7:00 PM			Jofren Santos; Kevin Hernandez; José "Picu" Rodríguez.	Attendance: --

February 10, 2017 3	Metropolitan FA - B	0–0	Caguas Sporting FC	San Juan
8:00 PM				Stadium: Cantera Football Park; Attendance: --

=== PRSL ===
The 2017 PRSL regular season schedule has not been announced.

=== Copa Luis Villarejo ===
The 2017 Copa Luis Villarejo schedule has not been announced.
