= Millito Navarro =

Puerto Rican baseball player (1905–2011)

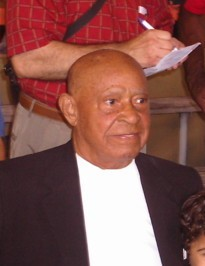
- Second baseman / Shortstop
- Born: September 26, 1905; Patillas, Puerto Rico
- Died: April 30, 2011 (aged 105); Ponce, Puerto Rico
- Batted: Right Threw: Right

Negro leagues debut
- 1928, for the Cuban Stars (East)

Last Negro leagues appearance
- 1937, for the Cuban Stars (East)

Negro leagues (Note: On December 16, 2020, Major League Baseball declared certain Negro leagues, from the span of 1920–1948, to be "major" leagues. Navarro's statistics reflect his time in the Negro leagues from 1928–1929.) statistics
- Batting average: .286
- Hits: 53
- Runs batted in: 20

Teams
- Cuban Stars (East) (1928–1929, 1937)

Career highlights and awards
- Administrator, Paquito Montaner Stadium; Ciudad Deportiva Millito Navarro; Parque de los Ponceños Ilustres; "The Ideal Professional Baseball Player"; MLB ceremonial Negro League draftee - NYY; Puerto Rico Baseball Hall of Fame Inductee; Puerto Rican Sports Hall of Fame Inductee; Hispanic Heritage Baseball Museum Hall of Fame Inductee

Emilio Navarro (September 26, 1905 – April 30, 2011), better known as "Millito Navarro", was a Puerto Rican second baseman and shortstop. He was the second Puerto Rican to play baseball in the American Negro leagues, two years after Gacho Torres played for the 1926 Newark Stars. At the time of his death, at age 105, Navarro was the oldest former professional baseball player and the last surviving player from the American Negro League.

== Biography ==
Navarro was born in Patillas, Puerto Rico, to Botello and Pepa Navarro, and raised in the city of Ponce. His father was a well-known shoemaker in Patillas who died when Emilio was 6 years old. His widowed mother soon moved to Ponce where she had family. From a young age, Navarro helped his family economically by selling newspapers, peanuts and ice. In Ponce he attended Castillo Public School, a public school on Calle Castillo, Ponce, and worked after school shining shoes and delivering the foods which his mother prepared to support the family. His first contact with baseball occurred when he went to watch the school team play. On one occasion he did not have enough money to pay for an entrance ticket to watch a game between the Castillo and Reina teams. He therefore jumped a fence, which happened to be in the outfield. It so happened that one of the Castillo team members became sick and when the coach saw Navarro jump the fence he asked him to play. He agreed and played baseball since.

After graduating from high school, Navarro was offered a grant to attend the University of Puerto Rico in Mayagüez, which he turned down. Instead, Navarro felt that he should help his family financially and believed that he was more than ready to play in the Major Leagues in the U.S.

== Baseball career ==
In the 1920s, the United States was a racially segregated country and Navarro's skin color presented a problem for his participation in American baseball leagues — in baseball, black players were not permitted to play in the same leagues as their white counterparts. As a consequence of this policy, a group of white and black businessmen joined forces and organized their own Negro leagues. The teams played against each other and even had their own Negro World Series. Two of those teams were the Cuban Stars, owned by Alex Pompez, and the Cuban Giants. Both of those teams consisted mainly of African-American or Afro-Latino players.

Navarro played for two years with the Cuban Stars and had a batting average of .337. The experience was bittersweet for Navarro, especially when they played in the South — he felt discriminated against due both to his skin color and his lack of English. After playing with the Negro leagues, Navarro traveled and played for teams in the Dominican Republic and in Venezuela.

By the time baseball had become integrated in the United States, Navarro had returned to Puerto Rico. The experience and knowledge he had gained contributed to his success when he became one of the founders of the Leones de Ponce baseball team in his hometown of Ponce. He played, coached, and contributed in various other ways in the team, dedicating 20 years of his life to the "Leones".

== Retirement from baseball ==
After Navarro retired from active baseball, he worked as administrator of the Francisco "Paquito" Montaner Stadium in Ponce, a position that he held for 10 years.

== Awards and accolades ==
In 1938, Puerto Rican sportswriter Emilio Huike voted Navarro as the "Ideal Professional Baseball Player".

Navarro became a centenarian on September 26, 2005, and the following years saw many tributes to him in both Puerto Rico and the United States. His life and experiences in baseball were part of an American documentary called "Beisbol", on the contributions and influence of Hispanics in America's national pastime. He was elected to the Puerto Rico Baseball Hall of Fame in 1992 and the Puerto Rican Sports Hall of Fame in 2004. The Senate of Puerto Rico presented him with Resolution #1026 in recognition of his contributions to baseball on June 7, 2005. On December 29, 2006, Navarro was inducted into the Hispanic Heritage Baseball Museum Hall of Fame. Former Astros great José (Cheo) Cruz presented the plaque of induction to Navarro.

On June 6, 2008, Major League Baseball held a ceremonial Negro league draft prior to the amateur draft. Navarro was selected by the New York Yankees. He was also honored at a game during the final homestand in Yankee Stadium history on September 18, 2008. In 2010, Navarro was honored by "Experience Works" who recognized him as an outstanding active Senior Citizen in the United States.

== Later years and death ==
On April 27, 2011, Navarro was hospitalized at Hospital San Lucas in Ponce after suffering a minor heart attack. On April 28, he was transferred to the hospital's intensive care unit after suffering a stroke. He died two days later on April 30, 2011, after failing to overcome the effects of his stroke. He was survived by four children, 11 grandchildren, nine great-grandchildren and one great-great-grandchild.

== Legacy ==
On May 1, 2011, the New York Yankees held a moment of silence to honor Navarro before the start of their game against the Toronto Blue Jays. In 2011, his home municipality of Ponce named a sports complex after him, Ciudad Deportiva Millito Navarro. He is also recognized at Ponce's Parque de los Ponceños Ilustres in the area of sports.

== See also ==
- List of Puerto Ricans
- List of Negro league baseball players
- Black history in Puerto Rico
