= Guayama FC Stadium =

Proposed soccer-specific stadium for Guayama, Puerto Rico

Estadio de Fútbol Dr. Roberto Monroig
- Full name: Unofficial Name - Estadio de Fútbol Guayama. Official name to be confirmed.
- Location: Guayama, Puerto Rico
- Owner: Municipio de Guayama
- Operator: Municipio de Guayama
- Capacity: 1,500
- Surface: Grass
- Record attendance: ———
- Field size: 110 x 70 m

Construction
- Groundbreaking: 2013
- Built: 2015-present
- Opened: ———
- Renovated: ———
- Closed: 2016
- Demolished: ———
- Cost: $6,400,000
- Architect: Cárrera Arquitectos PSC
- Project manager: OIB. LLC
- Structural engineers: Alonso & Carus Iron Works, Inc.

Tenant
- Guayama FC

Guayama FC Stadium is a proposed soccer-specific stadium which is to be located in the Guayama Sports Complex of Guayama, Puerto Rico near a plot of land adjacent to the Pista de Atletismo Dr. Roberto Monroig, which is currently used exclusively for the practice of football and athletics. The stadium is set to include a smaller pitch alongside it for youth teams to practice. The construction for the new stadium was scheduled to begin to be built in time for the 2014 season. The project came to a complete halt around 2016. The soccer-specific stadium, designed to meet FIFA standards, will be finished to host international and local competitions. It will include seating, grandstands with a capacity for approximately 1,500 to 2,000 spectators, a pitch with natural grass field (110m x 70m), and locker rooms (space for 25 lockers per team), a clubhouse, and medical/physiotherapy areas.

Some of the reasons for the complete halt for the stadium were : • Financial Crisis: The funding for the stadium was tied to the Government Development Bank (GDB), which suffered a liquidity crisis during Puerto Rico's debt restructuring.

• Contractor Bankruptcy: The construction company, OTB LLC, filed for bankruptcy after being paid roughly $3.3 million of a $6 million contract, leaving the site unfinished.

• Audits and Neglects: A 2023 Comptroller’s report highlighted that the municipality paid for work that was never completed.

As for the name of the stadium, the past mayor of Guayama Eduardo Cintrón confirmed that it had already been proposed by several groups that it should bear the name of Doctor Roberto Monroig. On February 9, 2026 the mayor of Guayama Hon. O’Brain Vázquez Molina announced that the stadium was going to be finished completely.

== Design ==
The project is being designed by Cabrera Architects. The proposed capacity of the stadium would be around 1,500 spectators of natural grass, but can be expanded to 2,000 . Its features are similar to that of the great stadiums which will have; a Club House for VIP, conference area, clubhouse amenities with Space for 25 lockers for players and transmission booths for press, radio, television, and two designated areas to give soccer lessons.

== History ==
Back in 2013, the municipal government of Guayama, together with governor Alejandro García Padilla, announced the construction of a new football stadium for Guayama, Puerto Rico. The proposed stadium will be located on land attached to the Pista Atlética Doctor Roberto Monroig, which is currently used exclusively for soccer practice. The proposed stadium was a campaign promise of the mayor, according to the chief executive of Guayama, and the central government has committed $3 million for the project. The rest of the proposed project would be financed by a loan from the Government Development Bank of the Commonwealth of Puerto Rico. The stadium's capacity would be around about 1,500 spectators natural grass, and it will have a VIP area, and two areas designated to teach football.

In June 2016, The stadium was constructed at the sports complex of Guayama, where the Coliseum Roque Nido, the Marcelino Blondet stadium, an athletics track and a small basketball court and handball is. The work is in charge of the company OIB and designed by the architectural firm career, Guaynabo. Field measurements will be 110 by 70 meters, suitable for all local and international event while will have a power plant that will prevent matches are canceled in the event of a power failure in Guayama. The building began construction in December 2015 and will be available for the month of December 2016.

== Controversies ==
In November 2015, Puerto Rico accumulation senator belonging to the Puerto Rican Independence Party, the Hon. Maria de Lourdes Santiago, in a press release criticized the allocation of $1 million for the construction of the new football stadium Guayama. "It is absolutely outrageous and offensive that at a time when the closure of 580 schools to reduce costs is proposed, most of the Popular Party deems prudent to use the money of the workers of Puerto Rico for assignments like (these)" subtracts the statement released by Senator's office with a list of works that includes the football stadium Guayama.
