= EF Taurinos de Cayey =

Association football club based in Cayey, Puerto Rico

- Full name: Escuela de Fútbol Taurinos de Cayey
- Founded: 2004; 22 years ago
- Stadium: Estadio Ángel Luís Correa, Cayey, Puerto Rico
- Capacity: 1,000
- Chairman: Jose Martinez
- Manager: Rafael Ramos
- League: Liga Puerto Rico Pro
- 2026 Clausura: Regular Season: 8th
- Website: eftcpr.com

Escuela de Fútbol Taurinos de Cayey is a Puerto Rican association football team from Cayey, Puerto Rico. The team currently plays in the Liga Puerto Rico Pro.

The team is a non-profit organization founded in 2004 by coaches José "Cukito" Martínez and Ángel Santos Renta. Its current headquarters are the University of Puerto Rico, Cayey Campus Soccer Complex and Ángel Luis Correa Park.

== Domestic history ==
Season	League	Places	MP	W	D	L	PTS	Playoffs	Manager
2024-25 Clausura	1st	7th	18	5	4	9	19	DNQ	(Puerto Rico) José Martinez
2025-26 Apertura	1st	6th	18	7	2	9	23	DNQ	(Puerto Rico) José Martinez
2025-26 Clausura	1st	8th	20	5	4	11	19	DNQ	(Puerto Rico) José Martinez
2026-27 Apertura	1st								(Puerto Rico) Rafael Ramos

=== Year-by-year ===
Season	LPR Pro									Playoffs	CFU Club Championship	Top goalscorer		Managers
Season	Div.	Pos.	Pl.	W	D	L	GS	GA	P	Playoffs	CFU Club Championship	Name	League	Managers
2024-25	Clausura	7th	18	5	4	9	38	55	19	DNQ	Did not enter	(Puerto Rico) Guiwyn Alsina	8	(Puerto Rico) José Martinez
2025-26	Apertura	6th	18	7	2	9	36	34	23	DNQ	Did not enter	(Puerto Rico)	-	(Puerto Rico) José Martinez
2025-26	Clausura	8th	20	5	4	11	44	45	19	DNQ	Did not enter	(Colombia) Christian Aragon	16	(Puerto Rico) José Martinez
2026-27	Apertura	-							-	-	To be decided.	(Puerto Rico)	-	(Puerto Rico) Rafael Ramos
2026-27	Clausura	-	-	-	-	-	-	-	-	-	To be decided.	(Puerto Rico)	-	(Puerto Rico) Rafael Ramos
