= Rodolfo Sulia =

Puerto Rican footballer

Personal information
- Full name: Rodolfo Eduardo III Sulia Herrera
- Date of birth: August 8, 2002 (age 24)
- Place of birth: Carolina, Puerto Rico
- Height: 1.88 m (6 ft 2 in)
- Position: Defender

Team information
- Current team: FC Naples
- Number: 32

Youth career
- –2019: Mirabelli SA
- 2019–2020: Gimnasia y Esgrima

Senior career*
Years	Team	Apps	(Gls)
2020	Satélite Norte		
2020–2021	Metropolitan FA		
2021	Chicago House	17	(1)
2022	Puerto Rico Sol	14	(3)
2023	Fort Wayne FC	0	(0)
2024	Academia Quintana		
2025–2026	FC Naples	13	(0)
2026–	Academia Quintana	5	(0)

International career^{‡}
2020–	Puerto Rico U20	3	(0)
2019–	Puerto Rico	32	(4)
- * Club domestic league appearances and goals as of 31 October 2025 ‡ National team caps and goals as of 16 November 2026

Rodolfo Eduardo III Sulia Herrera (born August 8, 2002) is a Puerto Rican football player who currently plays as a defender for Academia Quintana in the Liga Puerto Rico Pro.

== Club career ==
Sulia joined the reserve squad of Club Gimnasia y Esgrima of Argentina’s Primera Nacional from local side Mirabelli SA in 2019.

In February 2020 Sulia went on trial with North Texas SC of USL League One. He was originally identified by North Texas SC in 2019 when he trialed with its parent club, FC Dallas of Major League Soccer.

In October 2020 Sulia joined Satélite Norte FC of the Copa Simón Bolívar, the second tier league of Bolivia.

By 2021 he had joined reigning Liga Puerto Rico champions Metropolitan FA as it prepared for its 2021 Caribbean Club Championship campaign.

On June 9, 2021, Sulia and fellow Puerto Rican Joel Serrano joined National Independent Soccer Association club Chicago House AC.

In 2025 Sulia joined FC Naples and made his first appearance against the Little Rock Rangers in the U.S. Open Cup as a substitute.

== Career statistics ==
=== International ===
As of matches played 16 November 2026.

National team	Year	Apps	Goals
Puerto Rico	2019	5	0
Puerto Rico	2020	0	0
Puerto Rico	2021	3	0
Puerto Rico	2022	1	0
Puerto Rico	2023	6	1
Puerto Rico	2024	6	1
Puerto Rico	2025	6	1
Puerto Rico	2026	5	1
Total		32	4

Scores and results list Puerto Rico's goal tally first, score column indicates score after each Sulia goal.

List of international goals scored by Rodolfo Sulia
No.	Date	Venue	Opponent	Score	Result	Competition
1	9 September 2023	Thomas Robinson Stadium, Nassau, Bahamas	Bahamas	4–1	6–1	2023–24 CONCACAF Nations League B
2	11 October 2024	Trinidad Stadium, Oranjestad, Aruba	Sint Maarten	1–0	2–3	2024–25 CONCACAF Nations League B
3	21 March 2025	Estadio Juan Ramón Loubriel, Bayamon, Puerto Rico	Dominican Republic	2–2	2–2	Friendly
4	27 September 2026	Windsor Park, Roseau, Dominica	Dominica	1–0	2–0	2026–27 CONCACAF Nations League B
