= Complejo Deportivo Torrimar =

Sports facility in Guaynabo, Puerto Rico

- Interactive map of Complejo Deportivo Torrimar
- Location: 19-22 Boulevard Ramirez de Arellano; Guaynabo, Puerto Rico
- Coordinates: 18.391729°N 66.115629°W
- Capacity: 1,000
- Surface: Artificial turf
- Public transit: Torrimar station

Construction
- Opened: March 3, 2011
- Cost: $100,000

Tenant
- Puerto Rico Surf SC (2020–present)

The Complejo Deportivo Torrimar (English: Torrimar Sports Complex) is a 1,000-seat multi-sport facility in Guaynabo, Puerto Rico. It is accessible by the Tren Urbano via Torrimar station.

== History ==
The official opening ceremony for the football facility took place on March 3, 2011. At a cost of approximately $100,000, it was the first municipal football facility opened in Guaynabo. In 2019 the football stadium underwent a half million dollar renovation that included the installation of artificial turf.

=== Field Upgrade Timeline ===
- March 2011 - Field opened.
- Jan. 2019 - Artificial turf installed.
