= DS Edusoccer Puerto Rico =

Association football club in Puerto Rico

- Full name: DS Edusoccer Puerto Rico
- Founded: 2016; 10 years ago
- Ground: Estadio Centroamericano de Mayagüez
- Capacity: 12,175
- Chairman: David Guillemat
- Manager: Julio Cesar Infante
- League: Liga Puerto Rico Pro
- 2026 Clausura: Regular Season: 7th
- Website: facebook.com
Home colours	Away colours

DS Edusoccer Puerto Rico is a Puerto Rican association football club based in Mayagüez that currently plays in the Liga Puerto Rico Pro, playing their home matches at the Estadio Centroamericano de Mayagüez.

== History ==
DS Edusoccer Puerto Rico is an international development Academy founded in 2016. It is affiliated with the Siello Football Group in Madrid, they focus on training youth players. To help provides a pathway for talented Puerto Rican players to get recognized, potentially earning scholarships or recruitment to professional clubs in Spain. DS Edusoccer started playing in the 2025 Clausura season of Liga Puerto Rico Pro and continue to play in the league currently

=== Kit History ===
Kit sponsorship
Kit supplier	Period	Ref.
(Spain) Joma	2025	
(United States) Nike	2026-present	

== Domestic history ==
Season	League	Places	MP	W	D	L	PTS	Manager
2025 Clausura	1st	5th	18	8	2	8	26	
2025 Apertura	1st	7th	18	4	1	13	13	(Spain) David Guillemat
2026 Clausura	1st	7th	20	7	2	11	23	(Spain) David Guillemat
2026 Apertura	1st							(Venezuela) Julio Cesar Infante

=== Year-by-year ===
Season	LPR Pro									Playoffs	CFU Club Championship	Top goalscorer		Managers
Season	Div.	Pos.	Pl.	W	D	L	GS	GA	P	Playoffs	CFU Club Championship	Name	League	Managers
2024-25	Clausura	5th	18	8	2	8	32	40	26	Cancelled	Did not enter	(Puerto Rico) Diego Santiago	10	(Puerto Rico)
2025-26	Apertura	7th	18	4	1	13	24	80	13	DNQ	Did not enter	(Puerto Rico)	-	(Spain) David Guillemat
2025-26	Clausura	7th	20	7	2	11	35	47	23	DNQ	Did not enter	(Puerto Rico)	-	(Spain) David Guillemat
2026-27	Apertura	-							-	-	To be decided.	(Puerto Rico)	-	(Venezuela) Julio Cesar Infante
2026-27	Clausura	-	-	-	-	-	-	-	-	-	To be decided.	(Puerto Rico)	-	(Venezuela) Julio Cesar Infante

== Current squad ==
Updated as of 26 October 2026. Note: Flags indicate national team as defined under FIFA eligibility rules; some limited exceptions apply. Players may hold more than one non-FIFA nationality.

No.	Pos.	Nation	Player
—	GK	CAN	Aiden Rushenas
—	GK	PUR	Axel Burgos
—	GK	PUR	Javier Alvarez
—	DF	PUR	Jedysus Figueroa
—	DF	PUR	Diego Hernandez
—	DF	COL	Juvenal Bassa
—	DF	VEN	Emanuel Mosquera
—	DF	PUR	Alfredo Diaz-Santillan
—	DF	PUR	Joshua Calderon
—	DF	PUR	Gustavo Mangini
—	MF	PUR	Kelvin Arteaga
—	MF	PUR	Roberto Ruiz
—	MF	PUR	Yan Toro
—	MF	CAN	Emilien Badiane

No.	Pos.	Nation	Player
—	MF	PUR	Diego Santiago
—	MF	PUR	Armando Girona
—	MF	PUR	Gabriel Roldan
—	MF	PUR	Yahir Gonzalez
—	MF	PUR	Alexander Lopez
—	MF	PUR	Andrejes Santos Valdes
—	MF	MEX	Gabriel Palomares
—	FW	PUR	Gianfranco Orama
—	FW	PUR	Pedro Perez
—	FW	PUR	Johniel Waters
—	FW	PUR	Kevin Torres
—	FW	PUR	Kevin Muniz
—	FW	PUR	Yadxiel Gonzalez
—	FW	PUR	Lorenzo Garay
