= Jan Mateo =

Puerto Rican footballer

Personal information
- Full name: Jan Carlos Mateo Delgado
- Date of birth: January 31, 2003 (age 23)
- Place of birth: San Juan, Puerto Rico
- Height: 1.75 m (5 ft 9 in)
- Positions: Defender; forward

Team information
- Current team: San Juan FC

Youth career
- GPS Puerto Rico

Senior career*
Years	Team	Apps	(Gls)
2018–2019	Guaynabo Gol SC		
2019–2020	GPS Puerto Rico		
2021–2022	Oriente Petrolero	0	(0)
2022	San Cristóbal	7	(0)
2022	Jarabacoa FC	0	(0)
2022–2024	Bayamon FC	7	(4)
2024-2025	Academia Quintana	17	(4)
2025–2026	Puerto Rico Surf SC	24	(7)
2026-	San Juan FC	6	(1)

International career^{‡}
2017	Puerto Rico U15		
2019	Puerto Rico U17	3	(0)
2020–	Puerto Rico U20	5	(4)
2019–	Puerto Rico	3	(0)
- * Club domestic league appearances and goals as of 14:24, 5 May 2022 (UTC) ‡ National team caps and goals as of 10 November 2021

Jan Carlos Mateo Delgado (born January 31, 2003) is a Puerto Rican football player who currently plays as a forward for San Juan FC.

== Club career ==
Mateo started his career with Puerto Rican side GPS San Juan. In 2021, he signed for Bolivian side Oriente Petrolero.

== Career statistics ==
=== Club ===
As of 5 May 2022.

Club	Season	League			Cup		Continental		Other		Total	
Club	Season	Division	Apps	Goals	Apps	Goals	Apps	Goals	Apps	Goals	Apps	Goals
Oriente Petrolero	2021	Bolivian Primera División	0	0	0	0	–		0	0	0	0
San Cristóbal	2022	LDF Banco Popular	4	0	0	0	–		0	0	4	0
Career total			4	0	0	0	0	0	0	0	4	0

=== International ===
As of matches played 25 January 2021.

National team	Year	Apps	Goals
Puerto Rico	2019	1	0
Puerto Rico	2021	3	0
Total		3	0
