= Puerto Rico Surf SC =

Association football club in Puerto Rico

- Full name: Puerto Rico Surf Soccer Club
- Founded: 2020; 6 years ago
- Ground: Complejo Deportivo Torrimar; Guaynabo, Puerto Rico
- Capacity: 1,000
- Chairman: Marco Vélez
- Manager: Javier Torres
- League: Liga Puerto Rico Pro
- 2026 Clausura: Regular Season: 4th Playoff: Semi-finalists
- Website: facebook.com
Home colours	Away colours

Puerto Rico Surf SC is a Puerto Rican association football club that currently plays in the Liga Puerto Rico Pro. It operates in the municipalities of Guaynabo, Dorado, and Aguadilla.

Affiliated with the national Surf Nation network since 2019–2020 season, the organization offers a complete development pathway from grassroots youth programs to top-flight domestic competition.

== History ==
On June 20, 2020 Global Premier Soccer Puerto Rico was announced as the newest of over thirty affiliates under the Surf Soccer umbrella, the club soon renamed and began known as Puerto Rico Surf SC. The club is affiliated with Elite Clubs National League member San Diego Surf SC.

== Current squad ==
As of February 14, 2026

Note: Flags indicate national team as defined under FIFA eligibility rules; some limited exceptions apply. Players may hold more than one non-FIFA nationality.

No.	Pos.	Nation	Player
—	GK	PUR	Gabriel Gordillo
2	GK	USA	Lucas Espada
3	DF	PUR	Armando Montalván
4	DF	PUR	Esteban Elizalde
8	DF	PUR	David Marrero
9	DF	PUR	Nikolai Zapolskikh
41	DF	PUR	Alejandro Viera
—	DF	PUR	Joaquín Murua
—	DF	PUR	Mauricio Ramos
12	DF	PUR	Andrés Suárez
35	DF	PUR	Daniel Morales
—	DF	PUR	Fernando Medina
17	DF	PUR	Adrián Burgos
26	DF	PUR	Kendall Pellot
33	DF	COL	Christian Niño
—	MF	PUR	Rodrigo Irizarry
—	MF	PUR	Lorenzo Marín
—	MF	PUR	Marcos Toledo
13	MF	PUR	Joseph Villafañe
21	MF	PUR	Jorge Rodríguez
21	MF	PUR	Alejandro Vivoni

No.	Pos.	Nation	Player
22	MF	PUR	Ryan López
32	MF	PUR	Ramón Cobian
34	MF	PUR	Carlos Sola
38	MF	PUR	Félix Dawson
9	MF	VEN	Sebastián León
27	MF	PUR	Samuel Soto
23	MF	PUR	Dereck Hernández
5	MF	PUR	Sebastián Villafañe
6	MF	PUR	Rodrigo Ferrer
7	MF	PUR	Lorenzo Báez
15	FW	PUR	Jan Mateo
18	FW	PUR	Adrián Faisca
—	FW	PUR	Pancho Berdasco
10	FW	PUR	César Velázquez
11	FW	PUR	Ricardo Bautista
14	FW	PUR	Cristian Hernández
31	FW	PUR	Xavier Casul
—	FW	PUR	Manuel Rosario
—	FW	PUR	Lucas Rivera
16	FW	PUR	Kevin Hernández

== Domestic history ==
Key

Champion Runners-up 3rd Place

=== Year-by-year ===
Season	LPR Pro									Playoffs	CFU Club Championship	Top goalscorer		Managers
Season	Div.	Pos.	Pl.	W	D	L	GS	GA	P	Playoffs	CFU Club Championship	Name	League	Managers
2023-24	Clausura	4th	7	3	1	3	21	17	10	Semi-finals	Did not enter	(Puerto Rico) Adriel Gonzalez	5	(Puerto Rico) Elismael Ortiz
2024-25	Apertura	4th	9	4	1	4	19	17	13	Semi-finals	Did not enter	(Puerto Rico) Unknown	-	(Puerto Rico) Elismael Ortiz
2024-25	Clausura	3rd	18	12	4	2	50	18	40	Cancelled	Did not enter	(Puerto Rico) Jorge Rodriguez	9	(Puerto Rico) Elismael Ortiz
2025-26	Apertura	4th	18	12	1	5	61	18	37	2nd	Did not enter	(Puerto Rico) Kevin Hernández	19	(Puerto Rico) Elismael Ortiz
2025-26	Clausura	4th	20	14	1	5	67	16	43	Semi-finals	Did not enter	(Puerto Rico) Kevin Hernández	12	(Puerto Rico) Elismael Ortiz
2026-27	Apertura	-							-	-	Did not enter	(Puerto Rico)	-	(Puerto Rico) Javier Torres
2026-27	Clausura	-	-	-	-	-	-	-	-	-	Did not enter	(Puerto Rico)	-	(Puerto Rico) Javier Torres
