= Parque Villa del Rey =

1200-seat association football stadium in Caguas, Puerto Rico

Parque Villa Del Rey
- Interactive map of Parque Villa Del Rey
- Location: Urbturabo Gardens; Caguas, Puerto Rico
- Coordinates: 18.2128°N 66.0429°W
- Capacity: 1,200
- Surface: Grass

Tenant
- Caguas Sporting FC

The Parque Villa Del Rey is a 1,200-seat association football stadium in Caguas, Puerto Rico. As of the 2018-19 Liga Puerto Rico season, it hosts the home matches of Caguas Sporting FC.
