= Guaynabo FC =

Association football club in Puerto Rico

- Full name: Guaynabo Fútbol Club
- Founded: 2023; 3 years ago (as Guaynabo FC); 2007; 19 years ago (as Guaynabo Gol)
- Ground: Guaynabo FC Soccer Field
- Capacity: 1,000
- Manager: Sebastián Uranga
- League: Liga Puerto Rico Pro
- 2026 Clausura: Regular Season: 10th
Home colours

Guaynabo FC is a Puerto Rican association football club based in Guaynabo that currently plays in the Liga Puerto Rico Pro.

== History ==
Guaynabo FC originally began as a youth organization known as FC Dallas Guaynabo, affiliated with the MLS team FC Dallas, and partnered with local club Guaynabo Gol SC whom they soon merged with. The team later rebranded and changed to its current name Guaynabo FC on December 5, 2022. A few weeks later, they thanked their sponsors for helping with the transition. The team also began a cognitive neuroscience program, becoming the first club in the entire CONCACAF to start one.

The team started playing in the 2024 Clausura season of Liga Puerto Rico Pro, the island's top division. After the winless season Guaynabo FC left the league, but come back in the 2026 Clausura season. The team finished 10th with 2 wins and 18 losses.

In October 2026, the team released a new kit with Venus Pizza PR as its main sponsor, made by Oqiqo Sport out of Paraguay.

=== Kit History ===
Kit sponsorship
Kit supplier	Period	Sponsor
(Puerto Rico) GS Sport	2023-2024	Welch's
Unknown	2025	Team name
(Paraguay) Oqiqo Sport	2026-present	Venus Pizza PR

== Domestic history ==
Season	League	Places	MP	W	D	L	PTS	Manager
2023-24 Clausura	1st	7th	7	1	0	6	3	(Puerto Rico) Hilton Prado
2025-26 Clausura	1st	10th	20	2	0	18	6	(Puerto Rico) Hector Rivera
2026-27 Apertura	1st							(Argentina) (Puerto Rico) Sebastián Uranga

== Current squad ==
As of February, 11 2026

Note: Flags indicate national team as defined under FIFA eligibility rules; some limited exceptions apply. Players may hold more than one non-FIFA nationality.

No.	Pos.	Nation	Player
1	GK	PUR	Sabastian Uranga (captain)
23	DF	PUR	Kevin Ortiz
21	MF	PUR	Yahir González
19	MF	PUR	José Sánchez
14	MF	PUR	Adrián Camacho
22	DF	PUR	Justin Marrero
7	MF	PUR	Christian Santiago
8	FW	USA	Donovan Carey
18	MF	PUR	Yafet Sánchez
12	FW	PUR	James López
28	DF	PUR	Wensley Carrasquillo

No.	Pos.	Nation	Player
30	GK	PUR	German Acevedo
29	MF	PUR	Wander Perez
17	DF	PUR	Jonathan Mercado
13	MF	PUR	Jean Maldonado
9	MF	PUR	Enrique Sánchez
3	DF	PUR	Alejandro Santiago
15	MF	PUR	Jefty Lopez

== Achievements ==
=== Manager history ===
- Hilton Prado - (Aug. 2023 - unknown)

=== Homegrown players ===
- Abraham Nelson Medina - Montilla CF
