= Kevin Torres =

Puerto Rican footballer

Personal information
- Full name: Kevin Omar Torres Torres
- Date of birth: January 30, 2003 (age 23)
- Place of birth: Jayuya, Puerto Rico
- Height: 5 ft 10 in (1.78 m)
- Position: Centre-forward

Team information
- Current team: DS Edusoccer

Youth career
- ?-2021: DS Edusoccer

Senior career*
Years	Team	Apps	(Gls)
2021–2023	Siello FC	0	(0)
2023–2025	AD Orcasitas	0	(0)
2025–2026	Academia Quintana	37	(42)
2026–	DS Edusoccer	0	(0)
- * Club domestic league appearances and goals as of 7 September 2026 ‡ National team caps and goals as of 7 September 2026

Kevin Omar Torres Torres (born January 30, 2003) is a Puerto Rican international soccer player who plays for Puerto Rican club DS Edusoccer in the Liga Puerto Rico Pro.

== Achievements ==
- Top goal scorer

Liga Puerto Rico Pro (1): 25/26 Clausura (27Gls)

== Career statistics ==
As of match played 20 August 2026

Appearances and goals by club, season and competition
Club	Season	League			National Cup		League Cup		Playoffs		Total	
Club	Season	Division	Apps	Goals	Apps	Goals	Apps	Goals	Apps	Goals	Apps	Goals
Academia Quintana	2025-2026	Liga Puerto Rico Pro	37	42	0	0	—		0	0	0	0
DS Edusoccer	2026-2027	Liga Puerto Rico Pro	0	0	0	0	0	0	0	0	0	0
Career total			37	42	0	0	0	0	0	0	0	0
