= Metropolitan FA =

Association football club in Puerto Rico

- Full name: Metropolitan Football Academy
- Short name: Metro
- Founded: 2012; 14 years ago
- Stadium: Parque Reparto Metropolitano
- Capacity: 1,000
- Owner(s): Connor Ulloa; Alfie Lozano; Vaughan Martínez
- Chairman: Jorge Silvetti
- Manager: Jorge Silvetti
- League: Liga Puerto Rico Pro
- 2026 Clausura: Regular Season: 2nd Playoff: Semi-finalists
- Website: metropolitanfootball.com
Home colors	Away colors

The Metropolitan Football Academy is a Puerto Rican professional association football club based in San Juan that currently plays in the Liga Puerto Rico Pro. The club plays its home matches at the Parque Reparto Metropolitano.

== History ==
Metropolitan FA was founded in 2012 by Argentine Jorge Silvetti. In 2015 the team finished third in the Copa Excelencia which took place that year in lieu of a Puerto Rico Soccer League season. By the 2016 season the club was competing in the resurrected Puerto Rico Soccer League, the top tier of football on the island. After finishing in second place during both halves of the regular season, the team had the most combined points in the league and advanced directly to the final. The club won the league championship in the playoff by defeating Bayamón FC in the final at the Juan Ramón Loubriel Stadium.

As part of pre-season preparations in 2017 Metropolitan FA competed in the annual Don Bosco Cup. The team won the silver medal in the tournament, falling 0–3 to GPS Puerto Rico in the final. The club finished the abbreviated 2017 regular season in third place before being eliminated in the playoff round. The league ceased operations following the season and Puerto Rico was without a top-tier competition until September 2018.

Metropolitan FA joined the nascent Liga Puerto Rico for its inaugural season in 2018/19. It went on to finish as the first-ever champions of the 8-team league. The club also finished runner-up in the Copa Luis Villarejo that season. The club began the 2019/20 campaign and was in a close second in the table but the season was eventually abandoned because of the COVID-19 pandemic and no champion was named. As reigning Puerto Rico champions, the club earned the right to compete in the 2020 Caribbean Club Shield. However, the tournament was also eventually cancelled because of the pandemic.

In August 2020 the club announced the signing of all-time leading scorer for the Puerto Rico national team Hector Ramos. Because no 2020/21 season was held in Puerto Rico, Metropolitan FA was still the nation's reigning champion, thus qualifying the team for an expanded 2021 Caribbean Club Championship which kicked off in May 2021. In preparation for the tournament, the club played two friendly matches against San Cristóbal FC of the Primera División de Republica Dominicana at the Félix Sánchez Olympic Stadium in March 2021. Metropolitan FA lost the first match 0–3. In the second match, the Puerto Rican side earned a 1–1 draw with Hector Ramos scoring Metropolitan's first-ever goal against an international opponent.

Metropolitan opened its 2021 Caribbean Club Championship with a match against Delfines del Este FC on 15 May. Metropolitan took the lead through a goal by Jorge Rivera in the 83rd minute but Delfines del Este leveled the score in the fifth minute of stoppage time. The match ended in a 1–1 draw. Two days later, Metropolitan earned its first win in international competition with a 4–0 victory over Bonaire champions SV Real Rincon. Hector Ramos opened the scoring with the eventual game-winner in the sixth minute while Jorge Rivera scored twice more. Real Rincon had previously won the bronze medal in the 2018 edition of the tournament. On the final matchday of the group stage, Delfines del Este defeated Real Rincon 10–0 and jumped ahead of Metropolitan at the top of the group on goal differential. However, CONCACAF ruled that Delfines fielded six ineligible players in its match against Metropolitan. As a result, Metropolitan was awarded a win for its match against Delfines, with the Puerto Rican club moving on to the semi-finals as a result. In the semi-final match, Metropolitan and Inter Moengotapoe of Suriname played an intense, but scoreless first half. Inter Moengotapoe broke the deadlock in the 53rd minute and went on to win 3–1 with Metropolitan's goal coming from Marc Nieves in the 95th minute.

By advancing the semi-finals, Metropolitan FA secured a place in the preliminary round of the 2021 CONCACAF League, becoming the first-ever team from Puerto Rico to qualify for the tournament. On 16 June 2021 it was determined by draw that Metropolitan FA would face FC Santa Lucía Cotzumalguapa of Guatemala in the Preliminary Round. In preparation for the series, the club signed former French youth international Jordan Barbara and Puerto Rican striker Ricardo Rivera.

=== Kit History ===
Kit sponsorship
Kit supplier	Period	Ref.
(Italy) Erreà	2022-2023	
Unknown	2024-present	

== Stadium ==
- Parque Reparto Metropolitano: 2015–present

== Current squad ==
As of 16 October 2026

No.	Pos.	Nation	Player
1	GK	CAN	Philip Reis
2	DF	USA	James Valkenburg
3	DF	PUR	Jose Luis Ferrer
4	DF	PUR	Damean Dominguez
5	MF	ARG	Guillermo Ocampo
8	MF	PUR	Marcos Martinez
9	FW	PUR	Jorge Rivera
10	MF	PUR	Joseph Marrero
11	FW	PUR	Christian Vargas
13	GK	PUR	Santiago Acevedo
15	MF	PUR	Luis Lozada
17	FW	PUR	Joel Burgos
19	MF	USA	Alexander Blanche
22	DF	CIV	Jean-Christophe Koffi
27	MF	PUR	Byron Ortiz
28	FW	PUR	Jheyron Ocasio
30	FW	PUR	Julian Terron
33	DF	PUR	Fabián Martínez
35	MF	PUR	Evan Vargas
54	GK	USA	Ernesto Márquez
77	FW	ESA	Caesar Rubio
89	FW	PUR	Karlos Ferrer
99	FW	PUR	Héctor Ramos

== Records ==
=== PRSL 2015–2017 ===
Key

Champion Runners-up 3rd Place

Season	Puerto Rico Soccer League									Overall	Ref.
Season	Div.	Pos.	Pl.	W	D	L	GS	GA	P	Overall	Ref.
2015	Copa Excelencia	3rd	10	6	3	1	34	11	21	3rd	
2016	Apertura	2nd	13	9	3	1	29	9	30	1st	
2016	Clausura	2nd	10	8	1	1	29	11	25	1st	
2017	Regular Season	3rd	9	5	2	2	18	10	17	3rd	
2017	Playoffs	4th	1	0	0	1	1	3	N/A	4th	

=== LPR PRO 2018-present ===
Season	Liga Puerto Rico									Domestic Cup	Play-offs
Season	Div.	Pos.	Pl.	W	D	L	GF	GA	Pts.	Domestic Cup	Play-offs
2018/19	1st	1st	21	16	3	2	52	23	51	2nd	1st
2019/20	1st	N/A	15	12	1	2	37	59	21	Not held	
2020/21	1st	Cancelled because of COVID-19 pandemic									
2021	1st	1st	6	5	0	1	32	8	15	Not held	2nd
2022	1st	1st	14	10	3	1	51	16	33	Not held	1st
2023–24 Apertura	1st	1st	7	7	0	0	?	?	21	?	2nd
2023–24 Clausura	1st	2nd	7	5	2	0	27	4	17	?	2nd
2024–25 Apertura	1st	2nd	9	7	1	1	35	8	22	?	2nd
2024–25 Clausura	1st	1st	18	15	3	0	82	11	48	?	1st (Note: Tournament was cancelled, crowned champions.)
2025-26 Apertura	1st	2nd	18	14	0	4	80	18	42	?	T-3rd
2025-26 Clausura	1st	2nd	20	15	4	1	86	12	49	?	T-3rd
2026-27 Apertura	1st										

=== Year-by-year ===
Season	PRSL									Playoffs	CFU Club Championship	Top goalscorer		Managers
Season	Div.	Pos.	Pl.	W	D	L	GS	GA	P	Playoffs	CFU Club Championship	Name	League	Managers
2015	Copa Excelencia	3rd	10	6	3	1	34	11	21	3rd	Did not enter	(Puerto Rico)	-	(Argentina) Jorge Silvetti
2016	Apertura	2nd	13	9	3	1	29	9	30	1st	Did not enter	(Puerto Rico)	-	(Argentina) Jorge Silvetti
2016	Clausura	2nd	10	8	1	1	29	11	25	1st	Did not enter	(Puerto Rico) Karlos Ferrer	8	(Argentina) Jorge Silvetti
2017	1st	3rd	9	5	2	2	18	10	17	Semi-finals	Did not enter	(Puerto Rico)	-	(Argentina) Jorge Silvetti
Season	LPR Pro									Playoffs	CFU Club Shield	Top goalscorer		Managers
Season	Div.	Pos.	Pl.	W	D	L	GS	GA	P	Playoffs	CFU Club Shield	Name	League	Managers
2018-19	1st	1st	21	16	3	2	55	23	51	1st	Cancelled	(Argentina) Adrián Oviedo	16	(Argentina) Jorge Silvetti
2019-20	1st	2nd	15	12	1	2	59	21	37	Cancelled	Cancelled	(Argentina) Adrián Oviedo	17	(Argentina) Jorge Silvetti
2020-21	1st	Season Cancelled due to COVID-19												(Argentina) Jorge Silvetti
2021	1st	1st	6	5	0	1	32	8	15	2nd	Did not enter	(Puerto Rico)	-	(Argentina) Jorge Silvetti
2022	1st	1st	14	10	3	1	51	16	33	1st	4th place	(Puerto Rico)	-	(Argentina) Jorge Silvetti
2022-23	Apertura	1st	8	7	0	1	26	7	21	1st	Quarter-finals	(Puerto Rico)	-	(Argentina) Jorge Silvetti
2022-23	Clausura	1st	5	3	2	0	13	2	11	1st	Quarter-finals	(Puerto Rico)	-	(Argentina) Jorge Silvetti
2023-24	Apertura	1st	7	7	0	0			21	2nd	Did not enter	(Puerto Rico) Luis Figueroa	6	(Argentina) Jorge Silvetti
2023-24	Clausura	2nd	7	5	2	0	27	4	17	2nd	Did not enter	(Puerto Rico) Héctor Ramos	5	(Argentina) Jorge Silvetti
2024-25	Apertura	2nd	9	7	1	1	35	8	22	2nd	Semi-finals	(Argentina) Diego Amarilla	9	(Argentina) Jorge Silvetti
2024-25	Clausura	1st	18	15	3	0	82	11	48	1st	Semi-finals	(Argentina) Gabriel Mendez	16	(Argentina) Jorge Silvetti
2025-26	Apertura	2nd	18	14	0	4	80	18	42	Semi-finals	Did not enter	(Puerto Rico) Jorge Rivera	29	(Argentina) Jorge Silvetti
2025-26	Clausura	2nd	20	15	4	1	86	12	49	Semi-finals	Did not enter	(Puerto Rico) Jorge Rivera	20	(Argentina) Jorge Silvetti
2026-27	Apertura	-							-	-	To be decided.	(Puerto Rico)	-	(Argentina) Jorge Silvetti
2026-27	Clausura	-	-	-	-	-	-	-	-	-	To be decided.	(Puerto Rico)	-	(Argentina) Jorge Silvetti

=== International competition results ===
The following is a list of results for Metropolitan FA in international competitions. Metropolitan FA's scores are listed first.

Year	Tournament	Round	Opponent	Home	Away	Agg.
2020	Caribbean Club Shield	Group Stage				
2020	Caribbean Club Shield	Group Stage	Santiago de Cuba	Cancelled		
2020	Caribbean Club Shield	Group Stage	(Cayman Islands) Scholars International	Cancelled		
2020	Caribbean Club Shield	Group Stage	(Suriname) Inter Moengotapoe	Cancelled		
2021	Caribbean Club Shield	Group Stage				
2021	Caribbean Club Shield	Group Stage	(Saint Kitts and Nevis) St. Paul's United	Cancelled		
2021	Caribbean Club Shield	Group Stage	(Suriname) Inter Moengotapoe	Cancelled		
2021	Caribbean Club Championship	Group Stage	(Dominican Republic) Delfines del Este		3–0	
2021	Caribbean Club Championship	Group Stage	(Bonaire) Real Rincon		4–0	
2021	Caribbean Club Championship	Semi-finals	(Suriname) Inter Moengotapoe		1–3	
2021	CONCACAF League	Preliminary Round	(Guatemala) Santa Lucía	1–2	0–3	1–5
2023	CONCACAF Caribbean Shield	Group Stage	(Saint Kitts and Nevis) St. Paul's United		2–0	
2023	CONCACAF Caribbean Shield	Group Stage	(Collectivity of Saint Martin) Junior Stars		3–0	
2023	CONCACAF Caribbean Shield	Group Stage	(Curaçao) Jong Holland		2–0	
2023	CONCACAF Caribbean Shield	Semi-finals	(Suriname) Robinhood		0–5	
2023	CONCACAF Caribbean Shield	Third Place Match	(Trinidad and Tobago) Club Sando		1–6	
2024	CFU Club Shield	Round of 16	(Turks and Caicos Islands) SWA Sharks		2–0	
2024	CFU Club Shield	Quarter-finals	(Dominican Republic) Atlético Pantoja		0–1	
2026	CFU Club Shield	Round of 16	(Saint Vincent and the Grenadines) North Leeward Predators		4–0	
2026	CFU Club Shield	Quarter-finals	(United States Virgin Islands) Helenites		2–1	
2026	CFU Club Shield	Semi-finals	(Dominican Republic) Delfines del Este		0–0	

== Achievements ==
Puerto Rico Soccer League

- Season Champions (1): 2016
- Playoff Champions (1): 2016

Liga Puerto Rico Pro

- Season Champions (5): 2018–19, 2022, 2022-23 Apertura, 2022-23 Clausura, 2024-25 Clausura
- Runner-up (4): 2021, 2023–24 Apertura, 2023-24 Clausura, 2024-25 Apertura

Copa Luis Villarejo

- Runner-up (1): 2019

Copa Don Bosco

- Runner-up (1): 2017
