= Parque Reparto Metropolitano =

Football stadium in San Juan, Puerto Rico

- Interactive map of Parque Reparto Metropolitano
- Location: Calle 21 SE, Esq. 52 SE Río Piedras; San Juan, Puerto Rico
- Coordinates: 18.3974°N 66.0785°W
- Capacity: 1,000
- Surface: Grass

Tenant
- Metropolitan FA (2015–present)

The Parque Reparto Metropolitano is a 1,000-seat association football stadium in San Juan, Puerto Rico. As of the 2018-19 Liga Puerto Rico season, it hosts the home matches of Metropolitan FA. It is also home to the administrative offices of the club.
