= Ricardo Rivera =

Puerto Rican association football player

Personal information
- Full name: Ricardo Emmanuel Rivera de León
- Date of birth: 17 April 1997 (age 29)
- Place of birth: San Juan, Puerto Rico
- Height: 5 ft 10 in (1.78 m)
- Position: Forward

Team information
- Current team: Academia Quintana
- Number: 20

Youth career
- 2004–2015: Atlético de San Juan
- 2015–2016: Racing Algemesí CF

College career
Years	Team	Apps	(Gls)
2016–2018	UPR Mayagüez		

Senior career*
Years	Team	Apps	(Gls)
2018–2021	Vilamarxant CF	72	(13)
2021–2022	Union Omaha	20	(1)
2023	Buñol	0	(0)
2024	O&M FC	29	(5)
2025	Miami FC	8	(0)
2026–	Academia Quintana	16	(9)

International career^{‡}
2012	Puerto Rico U17	3	(0)
2016	Puerto Rico U20	3	(0)
2019	Puerto Rico U23	3	(2)
2016–	Puerto Rico	48	(23)
- * Club domestic league appearances and goals as of 30 May 2026 ‡ National team caps and goals as of 19:30, 16 November 2026 (UTC)

Ricardo Emmanuel Rivera de León (born 17 April 1997) is a Puerto Rican professional footballer who plays as a forward for Liga Puerto Rico Pro club Academia Quintana and the Puerto Rico national team.

== Early life ==
Rivera played most of his youth career at Club Atlético de San Juan, before moving to Valencia in 2015, where he played one year at Racing Algemesí. From 2016 to 2018, he played college soccer at UPR Mayagüez, where he won the championship twice, and earned awards including MVP and top goalscorer.

== Club career ==
=== Villamarxant ===
In 2018, Rivera tried out and signed with Villamarxant CF of the Tercera División.

=== Miami FC ===
Rivera signed with USL Championship club Miami FC in January 2025.

== International career ==
Rivera was called up to the Puerto Rico national under-17 team under manager Jeaustin Campos in 2012, for the FIFA U17 World Cup Qualifiers. In 2016 he played for the Puerto Rico national under-20 team. In the same year, he was called up, and made his debut for the senior national team, for friendly matches against the Dominican Republic. In July 2019, he was called up to the Puerto Rico national under-23 team, for the 2020 CONCACAF Olympic Qualifying Tournament. He scored the winning goal in the 93' minute in his debut against Antigua and Barbuda.

Rivera concluded the 2022 World Cup qualifiers as the team’s leader in goals, with four. Puerto Rico finished this stage second in their group, but only Saint Kitts and Nevis advanced.

== Career statistics ==
=== International ===
As of match played 16 November 2026

Appearances and goals by national team and year
National team	Year	Apps	Goals
Puerto Rico	2016	2	0
Puerto Rico	2018	2	0
Puerto Rico	2019	5	0
Puerto Rico	2021	4	4
Puerto Rico	2022	2	4
Puerto Rico	2023	10	8
Puerto Rico	2024	8	2
Puerto Rico	2025	6	1
Puerto Rico	2026	9	4
Total		48	23

Scores and results list Puerto Rico's goal tally first.

List of international goals scored by Ricardo Rivera
No.	Date	Venue	Opponent	Score	Result	Competition
1	28 March 2021	Mayagüez Athletics Stadium, Mayagüez, Puerto Rico	Trinidad and Tobago	1–1	1–1	2022 FIFA World Cup qualification
2	2 June 2021	Mayagüez Athletics Stadium, Mayagüez, Puerto Rico	Bahamas	2–0	7–0	2022 FIFA World Cup qualification
3	2 June 2021	Mayagüez Athletics Stadium, Mayagüez, Puerto Rico	Bahamas	4–0	7–0	2022 FIFA World Cup qualification
4	8 June 2021	Georgetown Football Stadium, Georgetown, Guyana	Guyana	1–0	2–0	2022 FIFA World Cup qualification
5	12 June 2022	Mayagüez Athletics Stadium, Mayagüez, Puerto Rico	British Virgin Islands	2–0	6–0	2022–23 CONCACAF Nations League C
6	12 June 2022	Mayagüez Athletics Stadium, Mayagüez, Puerto Rico	British Virgin Islands	4–0	6–0	2022–23 CONCACAF Nations League C
7	12 June 2022	Mayagüez Athletics Stadium, Mayagüez, Puerto Rico	British Virgin Islands	5–0	6–0	2022–23 CONCACAF Nations League C
8	12 June 2022	Mayagüez Athletics Stadium, Mayagüez, Puerto Rico	British Virgin Islands	6–0	6–0	2022–23 CONCACAF Nations League C
9	26 March 2023	Mayagüez Athletics Stadium, Mayagüez, Puerto Rico	Cayman Islands	1–0	5–1	2022–23 CONCACAF Nations League C
10	26 March 2023	Mayagüez Athletics Stadium, Mayagüez, Puerto Rico	Cayman Islands	3–0	5–1	2022–23 CONCACAF Nations League C
11	9 September 2023	Thomas Robinson Stadium, Nassau, Bahamas	Bahamas	2–1	6–1	2023–24 CONCACAF Nations League B
12	12 September 2023	Mayagüez Athletics Stadium, Mayagüez, Puerto Rico	Antigua and Barbuda	2–0	5–0	2023–24 CONCACAF Nations League B
13	12 September 2023	Mayagüez Athletics Stadium, Mayagüez, Puerto Rico	Antigua and Barbuda	3–0	5–0	2023–24 CONCACAF Nations League B
14	21 November 2023	Juan Ramón Loubriel Stadium, Bayamón, Puerto Rico	Bahamas	1–0	6–0	2023–24 CONCACAF Nations League B
15	21 November 2023	Juan Ramón Loubriel Stadium, Bayamón, Puerto Rico	Bahamas	2–0	6–0	2023–24 CONCACAF Nations League B
16	21 November 2023	Juan Ramón Loubriel Stadium, Bayamón, Puerto Rico	Bahamas	3–0	6–0	2023–24 CONCACAF Nations League B
17	14 October 2024	Trinidad Stadium, Oranjestad, Aruba	Sint Maarten	2–1	2–1	2024–25 CONCACAF Nations League B
18	15 November 2024	Mayagüez Athletics Stadium, Mayagüez, Puerto Rico	Aruba	3–1	5–1	2024–25 CONCACAF Nations League B
19	21 March 2025	Juan Ramón Loubriel Stadium, Bayamón, Puerto Rico	Dominican Republic	1–0	2–2	Friendly
20	25 March 2026	Juan Ramón Loubriel Stadium, Bayamón, Puerto Rico	Guam	2–0	4–0	2026 FIFA Series
21	1 October 2026	Mayagüez Athletics Stadium, Mayagüez, Puerto Rico	Cayman Islands	1–0	3–0	2026–27 CONCACAF Nations League B
22	13 November 2026	Leonora National Track and Field Centre, Georgetown, Guyana	Dominica	1–0	4–2	2026–27 CONCACAF Nations League B
23	16 November 2026	Leonora National Track and Field Centre, Georgetown, Guyana	Guyana	2–3	2–4	2026–27 CONCACAF Nations League B
