= 2018–19 Bayamón FC season =

Bayamón FC
2018-19 season
- President: Alberto Santiago
- Manager: Jeffrey C. Casanova
- Stadium: Bayamón Soccer Complex
- Liga Puerto Rico: Runners-Up
- 2018 Bayamón Cup: Runners-Up
- FPF Preparatory Cup: Champions
- 2019 Copa Luis Villarejo: Winners
- Top goalscorer: League: Josep Becerra (32); All: Josep Becerra (54)

The 2018–19 Bayamón FC season, was the nineteenth season since the club's formation.

== Overview ==
In January 2018, Marco Vélez was appointed Head Coach following the exit of Delfin Ferreres. Bayamón FC finished runners-up in their preseason Bayamón Cup.

In March 2018, Bayamón FC began playing in the first Puerto Rican Football Federation Preparatory Tournament. They are currently first place and already secured their spot into the semi-finals stage. The team finished the group stage with an unbeaten streak of 9 wins, with Josep Becerra as the tournament top scorer. After beating Metropolitan FA in the semifinals, Bayamón advanced to the finals facing GPS Puerto Rico. Bayamón won the tournament after a 1-0 win against GPS Puerto Rico.

In August 2018, it was announced that Bayamón FC will participate as one of the 10 teams of the new Liga Puerto Rico.

== Competitions ==
=== Pre-season ===
==== 2018 Bayamón Cup ====
February 11 Group Stage	Bayamón FC	4-0	Deportivo Olimpia	Bayamón, PR
18:00 EDT				Stadium: Bayamón Soccer Complex

February 18 Group Stage	Bayamón FC	4-1	Blazers FC	Bayamón, PR
20:00				Stadium: Bayamón Soccer Complex

March 4 Semi-finals	Bayamón FC	10-0	Deportivo Olimpia	Bayamón, PR
20:00				Stadium: Bayamón Soccer Complex

March 11 Finals	Bayamón FC	0-0 (4–5 p)	Blazers FC	Bayamón, PR
20:00				Stadium: Bayamón Soccer Complex

==== FPF Preparatory Tournament ====
March 24 Group Stage	Bayamón FC	9-1	Guayama FC	Bayamón, PR
20:00 EDT	Josep Becerra 4', 20', 57', 74'; Lorenzo Báez 16', 23' (34); Christian Niño 81'; Elismael Ortíz 90+1'		Jeován Lebrón 63'	Stadium: Bayamón Soccer Complex

April 7 Group Stage	Criollos de Caguas FC	1-6	Bayamón FC	Caguas, PR
20:00	Rubén Díaz 85'		Christian Niño 5'; Ernesto Sánchez (o.g.); Josep Becerra 17', 53', 59'; Daniel Morales 90+2'	Stadium: Villa del Rey

April 14 Group Stage	Bayamón FC	6-0	Leal Arecibo FC	Bayamón, PR
20:00	Christian Niño 5'; Jeremy Roldán 28'; Daniel Morales 30'; Joseph Villafañe 64'; Josep Becerra 83'; Carlos Rosario 88'			Stadium: Bayamón Soccer Complex

April 22 Group Stage	Mirabelli SA	0-6	Bayamón FC	Caguas, PR
16:00			Jeremy Roldán 4', 7'; Josep Becerra 37'; Alejandro Cuartas 47'; Jorge Rosa 57'; Kenny Reynoso (o.g.)	Stadium: Villa del Rey

April 28 Group Stage	Bayamón FC	4-0	CD Barbosa	Bayamón, PR
20:00	Josep Becerra 7', 39', 78'; Jeremy Roldán 63'			Stadium: Bayamón Soccer Complex

May 5 Group Stage	Bayamón FC	5-0	Metropolitan FA	Bayamón, PR
20:00	Jeremy Roldán 42', 47'; Josep Becerra 51'; Alberto Santiago 52', 90+2'			Stadium: Bayamón Soccer Complex

May 12 Group Stage	Don Bosco FC	1-3	Bayamón FC	Santurce, PR
	Christian Niño 1'; Alejandro Cuartas 33'; Jeremy Roldán 37'	Report	Eloy Matos 38'	Stadium: Oratorio San Juan Bosco

May 19 Group Stage	Bayamón FC	6-1	GPS Puerto Rico	Bayamón, PR
	José Cortés 10'; Christian Niño 11'; Josep Becerra 18', 31'; Carlos Rosario 73'; Mateo Pérez 77'		Andrés Cabrero 87'	Stadium: Bayamón Soccer Complex

May 26 Group Stage	Bayamón FC	3-0	Guaynabo Gol	Bayamón, PR
20:00	Josep Becerra 13', 32'; Luis Cosme 83'			Stadium: Bayamón Soccer Complex

June 6 Semi-finals	Bayamón FC	5-1	Metropolitan FA	Bayamón, PR
20:00	Josep Becerra 17', 43'; Edric Toro 20'; Carlos Rosario 35'; Alejandro Cuartas 51'		Karlos Ferrer 30'	Stadium: Bayamón Soccer Complex

June 10 Final	Bayamón FC	1-0	GPS Puerto Rico	Bayamón, PR
16:00	Josep Becerra 42'			Stadium: Juan Ramón Loubriel Stadium; Attendance: 600

==== Friendlies ====
October 11, 2019	Bayamón FC	8-0	Vega Alta	Bayamón, PR
				Stadium: Bayamón Soccer Complex

February 14, 2019	Puerto Rico	2-2	Bayamón FC	Bayamón, PR
				Stadium: Juan Ramón Loubriel Stadium

=== Liga Puerto Rico ===
==== Results ====
September 30 1	Bayamón FC	3-2	Guayama FC	Bayamón, PR
16:00 EDT	Andrés Cabrero 3'; Luis Cosme 5'; Josep Becerra 21'	Report		Stadium: Bayamón Soccer Complex

October 17 2	Metropolitan FA	Suspended	Bayamón FC	San Juan, PR
20:00 EDT		Report		Stadium: Cancha Reparto Metropolitano

October 21 3	Don Bosco FC	1-8	Bayamón FC	Santurce
20:00 EDT	Luis Lorenzo 30'		Alejandro Rabell 6', 9', 61'; Jorge Rosa 24', 40'; Josep Becerra 49'; Alberto Martínez 59'; Joseph Villafañe 96'	Stadium: Oratorio San Juan Bosco

October 28 4	Mirabelli SA	3-2	Bayamón FC	Bayamón
20:00	José Miguel Delgado 7'; Albert Ortíz 28'; Yeriel 48'		Josep Becerra 20', 87'	Stadium: Bayamón Soccer Complex; Referee: William Anderson
Note: Games played in Bayamón but Mirabelli was the home team.

November 1 5	Bayamón FC	2-3	Guaynabo Gol	Bayamón
21:00	Josep Becerra 12', 30'	Report	Ruben Jordan 31', 36'; Samer Saleh 53'	Stadium: Bayamón Soccer Complex

November 7 2	Bayamón FC	4-0	Metropolitan FA	Bayamón
20:30	Josep Becerra 50', 87'; Carlos Rosario 79'; Maicol Roldán 90'			Stadium: Bayamón Soccer Complex; Referee: William Anderson
Note: Games was originally scheduled for October 17 but was suspended because of heavy weather. Game was played on November 7 and Bayamón FC was granted "Home".

November 27 7	Caguas Sporting	2-7	Bayamón FC	Caguas
18:00	Miguel Rivera 40' 90'		Josep Becerra 5' 32' 49'; Jorge Rosa 43'; Christian Niño 71'; Maicol Roldán 76' 81'	Stadium: Cancha Urbanización Villa del Rey

December 1 6	FC Mayagüez	1-8	Bayamón FC	Mayagüez
20:00	Kevin Martes 31'		Josep Becerra 37' 41' 45' 56' 59' 67'; Maicol Roldán 44'; César Mijares 88'	Stadium: Mayagüez Athletics Stadium

December 8 8	Guayama FC	0-3	Bayamón FC	Guayama
20:00			Josep Becerra 12' 65'; Alejandro Rabell 32'	Stadium: Complejo Recreativo de Guayama

December 16 9	Metropolitan FA	2-0	Bayamón FC	San Juan
20:00	Karlos Ferrer 5'; Adrián Oviedo 50'

January 12 10	Bayamón FC	3-3	Don Bosco FC	Bayamón
	Andrés Cabrero 26'; Carlos Rosario 31'; Christian Niño 40'		Jorge Rivera 50'; Dennis Beltré 71' 90+6'	Stadium: Bayamón Soccer Complex

January 19 11	Bayamón FC	4-0	Mirabelli SA	Bayamón
20:00	Daniel Morales 13'; Carlos Rosario 58'; Christian Niño 59'; Josep Becerra 63'			Stadium: Bayamón Soccer Complex

January 27 11	Guaynabo Gol SC	1-1	Bayamón FC	Guaynabo
19:00	Rubén Jordan 66'		Andrés Cabrero 27'	Stadium: Estadio Charlie Fuentes

February 2 13	Bayamón FC	3-0	FC Mayagüez	Bayamón
20:00	Carlos Rosario 31'; Alejandro Rabell 58'; Emmanuel D'Andrea 88'			Stadium: Bayamón Soccer Complex

February 10 14	Bayamón FC	5-0	Caguas Sporting FC	Bayamón
16:00	Josep Becerra 3' 63'; Andrés Cabrero 35'; Alejandro Rabell 74' 75'			Stadium: Bayamón Soccer Complex

February 16 15	Guayama FC	5-5	Bayamón FC	Guayama
20:00	Juan Vélez 6'; Emmanuel Torres 36' 49'; José I. González 70'; Félix Dawson 84'		Andrés Cabrero 7'; Josep Becerra 38' 45+1' 76'; Carlos Rosario 55'	Stadium: Complejo Área Recreativa de Guayama

February 24 16	Bayamón FC	2-0	Metropolitan FA	Bayamón
19:00	Josep Becerra 64' 73'			Stadium: Bayamón Soccer Complex

March 2 17	Don Bosco FC	0-4	Bayamón FC	Santurce
20:00			Christian Niño 9'; Josep Becerra 53'; Emmanuel D'Andrea 77'; Javier De La Rosa 82'	Stadium: Oratorio San Juan Bosco

March 9 18	Mirabelli SA	2-7	Bayamón FC	Santurce
20:00	Albert Ortíz 20'; Jeriel Meléndez 52'		Alejandro Rabell 34' 44'; Jorge Rosa 37' 75' 79'; Josep Becerra 82'; Juan Carlos Rodríguez 85'	Stadium: Oratorio San Juan Bosco

March 16 19	Bayamón FC	1-1	Guaynabo Gol	Bayamón
20:00	Josep Becerra 6'		Lorenzo Báez 78'	Stadium: Bayamón Soccer Complex

March 31 20	Caguas Sporting FC	0-3	Bayamón FC	Bayamón
21:00			Alejandro Rabell 8' 78'; Andrés Cabrero 83'	Stadium: Bayamón Soccer Complex
Note: Game was originally scheduled to be played on Caguas, but weather conditions forced it to move to Bayamón. Caguas Sporting FC played as Home.

Abril 6 21	Bayamón FC	10-0	FC Mayagüez	Bayamón
19:00	Andrés Cabrero 35' 86'; Emmanuel D'Andrea 39'; José Cortés 45'; Alejandro Rabell 50' 52' 69' 83'; Joseph Villafañe 78'; Juan Carlos Rodríguez 90'			Stadium: Bayamón Soccer Complex

May 1 Semi-finals Leg 1	Don Bosco FC	2-6	Bayamón FC	Santurce
20:00				Stadium: Oratorio San Juan Bosco

May 4 Semi-finals Leg 2	Bayamón FC	3-4	Don Bosco FC	Bayamón
20:00				Stadium: Bayamón Soccer Complex

May 11 Final	Metropolitan FA	0-0 (4-1 p)	Bayamón FC	Bayamón
16:00				Stadium: Juan Ramón Loubriel Stadium

==== Standings ====
Pos	Team	Pld	W	D	L	GF	GA	GD	Pts	Qualification or relegation
1	Metropolitan FA	21	16	3	2	55	23	+32	51	Advance to Playoffs (Semifinals)
2	Bayamón FC	21	14	4	3	85	26	+59	46	Advance to Playoffs (Semifinals)
3	Don Bosco FC	21	10	5	6	54	38	+16	35	Advance to Playoffs (Quarterfinals)
4	Guayama FC	21	11	2	8	50	44	+6	35	Advance to Playoffs (Quarterfinals)
5	Caguas Sporting FC	21	7	3	11	40	61	−21	24	Advance to Playoffs (Quarterfinals)
6	Guaynabo Gol SC	21	6	5	10	28	37	−9	23	Advance to Playoffs (Quarterfinals)
7	Mirabelli SA	21	5	0	16	31	59	−28	15	
8	Mayagüez FC	21	3	2	16	27	82	−55	11	

Source: Liga Puerto Rico

=== Copa Luis Villarejo ===
April 16 Second round	Villa Andalucía	0-5	Bayamón FC	Bayamón
8:00 PM			Alejandro Rabell 13'; Emmanuel D'Andrea 28'; Alejandro Rabell 36'; Jorge Rosa 62'; Andrés Cabrero 85'	Stadium: Bayamón Soccer Complex

April 24 Second round	Bayamón FC	5-1	Villa Andalucía	Bayamón
9:00 PM	Daniel Morales 26'; Alejandro Rabell 36'; Jorge Rivera 38'; Alejandro Rabell 44'; Daniel Morales 55'			Stadium: Bayamón Soccer Complex

May 16 Semi-finals Leg 1	Don Bosco FC	2-3	Bayamón FC	Santurce
8:00 PM			Jorge Rosa; Juan Carlos Rodríguez; Andrés Cabrero	Stadium: Oratorio San Juan Bosco

May 19 Semi-finals Leg 2	Bayamón FC	6-3	Don Bosco FC	Bayamón
6:00 PM	Joseph Villafañe; Josep Becerra; Jorge Rosa; Ian Martínez; Agustín Ortega			Stadium: Bayamón Soccer Complex

May 26 Final	Bayamón FC	3-1	Metropolitan FA	Bayamón
3:00 PM	Carlos Rosario 45'; Alejandro Rabell 82'; Agustín Ortega 90+3'			Stadium: Juan Ramón Loubriel Stadium
