= 2018–19 Liga Puerto Rico season =

Liga Puerto Rico
- Champions: Metropolitan FA
- Matches: 91
- Goals: 410 (4.51 per match)
- Top goalscorer: Josep Becerra (32 goals)
- Best goalkeeper: Sebastián Uranga
- Biggest home win: Bayamón FC 10–0 FC Mayagüez (7 April 2019)
- Biggest away win: Don Bosco FC 1–8 Bayamón FC (21 October 2018)
- Highest scoring: Caguas Sporting FC 3–7 Don Bosco FC (19 January 2019) Guayama FC 6–4 FC Mayagüez (26 January 2019) Guayama FC 5–5 Bayamón FC (16 February 2019) Caguas Sporting FC 2–8 Metropolitan FA (10 March 2019) Bayamón FC 10–0 FC Mayagüez (7 April 2019)
- Longest winning run: Metropolitan FA (6)
- Longest unbeaten run: Bayamón FC (12)
- Longest winless run: FC Mayagüez (10)
- Longest losing run: FC Mayagüez (8)
- All statistics correct as of July 30, 2019.

The 2018–19 Liga Puerto Rico season, is the league's inaugural season of Liga Puerto Rico.

== Summary ==
Following the absence of a football league in Puerto Rico for the 2017–18 season, the Puerto Rican Football Federation organized a Preparatory Tournament that ran from March until June 2018. 10 teams participated on the tournament won by Bayamón FC.

The league's launch conference was held on August 23, 2018. The league kicked off on September 29, 2018.

== Teams ==
Team	City	Stadium	Capacity	Founded	Joined	Head Coach
Bayamón FC	Bayamón	Bayamón Soccer Complex		1999	2018	(Spain) Josep Ferré
Caguas Sporting FC	Caguas	Estadio Villa del Rey		2016	2018	
Don Bosco FC	San Juan	Oratorio San Juan Bosco, Cantera, Santurce			2018	Lionel Simonetti
Mayagüez FC	Mayagüez	Mayagüez Athletics Stadium		2003	2018	Gladys "Cusi" Rivera
Guaynabo Gol SC	Guaynabo	Estadio Charlie Fuentes			2018	
Guayama FC	Guayama	Complejo Área Recreativa de Guayama			2018	Wilfredo "Willy Boyer"
Mirabelli SA	San Juan	Playing home games at Bayamón Soccer Complex			2018	Daniel "Beca" Ramos
Metropolitan FA	San Juan	Estadio Metropolitano del Reparto Metropolitano		2015	2018	(Argentina) Jorge Silveti

== Regular season ==
=== Standings ===
Pos	Team	Pld	W	D	L	GF	GA	GD	Pts	Qualification or relegation
1	Metropolitan FA	21	16	3	2	55	23	+32	51	Advance to Playoffs (Semifinals)
2	Bayamón FC	21	14	4	3	85	26	+59	46	Advance to Playoffs (Semifinals)
3	Don Bosco FC	21	10	5	6	54	38	+16	35	Advance to Playoffs (Quarterfinals)
4	Guayama FC	21	11	2	8	50	44	+6	35	Advance to Playoffs (Quarterfinals)
5	Caguas Sporting FC	21	7	3	11	40	61	−21	24	Advance to Playoffs (Quarterfinals)
6	Guaynabo Gol SC	21	6	5	10	28	37	−9	23	Advance to Playoffs (Quarterfinals)
7	Mirabelli SA	21	5	0	16	31	59	−28	15	
8	Mayagüez FC	21	3	2	16	27	82	−55	11	

Source: Liga Puerto Rico

=== Positions by round ===
The table lists the positions of teams after each week of matches. In order to preserve chronological evolvements, any postponed matches are not included in the round at which they were originally scheduled, but added to the full round they were played immediately afterwards. For example, if a match is scheduled for matchday 13, but then postponed and played between days 16 and 17, it will be added to the standings for day 16.

Team ╲ Round	1	2	3	4	5	6	7	8	9	10	11	12	13	14	15	16	17	18	19
Bayamón	1	1	1	1	3	2	2	1	2	2	2	2	2	2	2	2	2	2	2
Caguas Sporting	2	2	5	4	6	5	6	5	5	4	4	4	6	6	6	6	3	5	5
Don Bosco FC	5	7	8	7	7	7	7	7	7	6	6	5	3	4	5	3	4	3	3
Guayama	8	6	6	6	5	6	5	6	6	7	7	6	5	3	3	4	5	4	4
Guaynabo Gol	3	3	4	5	4	4	4	3	3	3	3	3	4	5	4	5	6	6	6
Mayagüez	7	8	7	8	8	8	8	8	8	8	8	8	8	8	8	8	8	8	8
Mirabelli	6	4	2	2	1	3	3	4	4	5	5	7	7	7	7	7	7	7	7
Metropolitan	4	5	3	3	2	1	1	2	1	1	1	1	1	1	1	1	1	1	1

Leader and qualification to playoffs
Qualification to playoffs
Last place in table

Source: Liga PR

== Results ==
=== Week 1 ===
September 29 1	Metropolitan FA	1–0	Don Bosco FC	San Juan
20:00 EDT	Antonio Enright 34'	Report		Stadium: Cancha Reparto Metropolitano; Referee: William Anderson

September 30 1	Bayamón FC	3–2	Guayama FC	Bayamón
16:00 EDT	Andrés Cabrero 3'; Luis Cosme 5'; Josep Becerra 21'	Report	Carlos Grueso 6', 90'	Stadium: Bayamón Soccer Complex; Referee: William Anderson

September 30 1	Mirabelli SA	0–1	Guaynabo Gol	San Juan
21:00 EDT		Report	62' Luis Díaz	Stadium: Estadio Reparto Metropolitano; Referee: Roberto Ortíz

September 30 1	FC Mayagüez	0–2	Caguas Sporting	Mayagüez
21:00 EDT		Report	Alexis Tavárez 47'; Ian Canino 64'	Stadium: Mayagüez Athletics Stadium; Referee: Fabian Chaparro

=== Week 2 ===
October 14 2	FC Mayagüez	1–3	Mirabelli SA	Mayagüez
16:00	Adrián Crúz 69'	Report	José Miguel Delgado 2', 81', 83'	Stadium: Mayagüez Athletics Stadium; Referee: Roberto Ortíz

October 14 2	Guaynabo Gol	0–0	Caguas Sporting FC	Santurce
16:00 EDT		Report		Stadium: Oratorio San Juan Bosco; Referee: José R. Torres

October 18 2	Don Bosco FC	2–2	Guayama FC	Santurce
	Denis Beltré 30', 66'	Report	José "Avena" González 2', 44'	Stadium: Oratorio San Juan Bosco; Referee: Jairo Morales

November 7 2	Bayamón FC	4–0	Metropolitan FA	Bayamón
20:30	Josep Becerra 50', 87'; Carlos Rosario 79'; Maicol Roldán 90'	Report		Stadium: Bayamón Soccer Complex; Referee: William Anderson
Note: Games was originally scheduled for October 17 but was suspended because of heavy weather. Game was played on November 7 and Bayamón FC was granted "Home".

=== Week 3 ===
November 18 3	Mirabelli SA	3–2	Caguas Sporting	Bayamón
20:00	Miguel Delgado 1'; Yeriel Meléndez 62'; José Miguel Delgado 72'		José Negrón 24'; Miguel Rivera 31'	Stadium: Bayamón Soccer Complex; Referee: José R. Torres
Note: Originally scheduled for October, but suspended due to rainy weather. Played on November 18 at Bayamón Soccer Complex.

October 21 3	Guaynabo Gol	1–1	FC Mayagüez	Bayamón
19:00	Alejandro Pujols 85'	Report	Jefferson Ortíz 88'	Stadium: Bayamón Soccer Complex; Referee: Fabián Chaparro

October 21 3	Guayama FC	0–2	Metropolitan FA	Guayama
16:00		Report	Marcos Ortíz 73'; Joshua Martínez 79'	Stadium: Complejo del Área Recreativa de Guayama; Referee: José R. Torres

October 21 3	Don Bosco FC	1–8	Bayamón FC	Santurce
17:00	Luis Lorenzo 29'	Report	Alejandro Rabell 6', 8', 59'; Jorge Rosa 23', 42'; Josep Becerra 49'; Carlos Rosario 58'; Joseph Villafañe 84'	Stadium: Oratorio San Juan Bosco; Referee: Roberto Ortíz

=== Week 4 ===
October 27 4	Don Bosco FC	2–2	Caguas Sporting	Santurce
20:00	Emilio Medina 64' (o.g.); Eloy Matos 77'	Report	Sergio Yris 30'; Edwin Vallejo 71'	Stadium: Oratorio San Juan Bosco; Referee: Fabian Chaparro

October 27 4	FC Mayagüez	1–4	Metropolitan FA	Mayagüez
20:00	Adrián Cruz 16'	Report	Adrian Oviedo 11', 47', 53'; Karlos Ferrer 21'	Stadium: Mayagüez Athletics Stadium; Referee: Roberto Ortíz

October 27 4	Guayama FC	2–1	Guaynabo Gol	Guayama
20:00	José I. González 73', 91'	Report	Alejandro Pujol 80'	Stadium: Complejo Recreativo de Guayama; Referee: William Anderson

October 28 4	Mirabelli SA	3–2	Bayamón FC	Bayamón
20:00	José Miguel Delgado 8'; Albert Ortíz 27'; Yeriel Meléndez 48'	Report	Josep Becerra 20', 88'	Stadium: Bayamón Soccer Complex; Referee: José R. Torres
Note: Games played in Bayamón but Mirabelli was the home team.

=== Week 5 ===
November 1 5	Bayamón FC	2–3	Guaynabo Gol	Bayamón
21:00	Josep Becerra 12', 29'	Report	Ruben Jordan 32', 36'; Samer Saleh 53'	Stadium: Bayamón Soccer Complex; Referee: William Anderson

November 8 5	Don Bosco FC	0–3	Mirabelli SA	Santurce
20:00		Report	Albert Ortíz 13', 35'; José Miguel Delgado 88'	Stadium: Oratorio San Juan Bosco; Referee: Roberto Ortíz

November 3 5	FC Mayagüez	3–4	Guayama FC	Mayagüez
21:00	Alberto Martín Rodríguez 7'; Adrián Cruz 48'; Héctor Rivera 83'	Report	Carlos Garay 4'; Axel Burgos 9'; José I. González 41'; Samuel Soto 68'	Stadium: Mayagüez Athletics Stadium; Referee: Fabian Chaparro

November 4 5	Metropolitan FA	3–1	Caguas Sporting	Bayamón
20:00	Karlos Ferrer 12'; Adrián Oviedo 39'; Christian Vargas 69'		Javier Irizarry 57'	Stadium: Bayamón Soccer Complex; Referee: William Anderson
Note: Game was moved to Bayamón Soccer Complex because of heavy rain in Estadio Metropolitano.

=== Week 6 ===
November 11 6	Metropolitan FA	4–1	Mirabelli SA	San Juan
20:00	Sebastián Díaz 36'; Christian Vargas 49', 80'; Adrián Oviedo 90+5'	Report	Rodolfo Sulia 29'	Stadium: Estadio Reparto Metropolitano; Referee: Carlos Ortíz

November 17 6	Guaynabo Gol	2–1	Don Bosco FC	Bayamón
20:00	Luis Díaz 12'; Jonathan Genero 19'		Shaquille Santos 53'	Stadium: Bayamón Soccer Complex; Referee: Fabian Chaparro

December 1 6	FC Mayagüez	1–8	Bayamón FC	Mayagüez
20:00	Kevin Martes 31'		Josep Becerra 36', 42', 45', 56', 58', 66'; Maicol Roldán 44'; César Mijares 88'	Stadium: Mayagüez Athletics Stadium; Referee: Fabian Chaparro

December 2 6	Caguas Sporting FC	4–1	Guayama FC	Caguas
20:30	Joshua Rodríguez 2', 16'; Javier Irizarry 52'; Miguel Rivera 86'		Carlos Garay 71'	Stadium: Cancha Urbanización Villa del Rey; Referee: Jairo Morales García

=== Week 7 ===
November 24 7	Guayama FC	4–3	Mirabelli SA	Guayama
20:00	Samuel Soto 12'; Axel Burgos 37'; José I. González 43'; Carlos Garay 60'		Albert Ortíz 2'; Yeriel Meléndez 40'; Own Goal 67'	Stadium: Complejo Recreativo de Guayama; Referee: José R. Torres

November 25 7	Don Bosco FC	5–0	FC Mayagüez	Santurce
17:00	Nelson Avilés 14'; Byron Ortíz 31'; Héctor Agosto 58'; Eloy Matos 72'; Juan Maceda 85'			Stadium: Oratorio San Juan Bosco; Referee: Oscar Hernández

November 27 7	Caguas Sporting	2–7	Bayamón FC	Caguas
18:00	Miguel Rivera 40', 90'		Josep Becerra 5', 32', 49'; Jorge Rosa 43'; Christian Niño 71'; Maicol Roldán 76', 81'	Stadium: Cancha Urbanización Villa del Rey; Referee: Roberto Ortíz

November 28 7	Metropolitan FA	1–1	Guaynabo Gol	San Juan
20:30	Adrián Oviedo 2'		Jonathan Genero 67'	Stadium: Estadio Reparto Metropolitano; Referee: José Raúl Torres

=== Week 8 ===
December 8 8	Guayama FC	0–3	Bayamón FC	Guayama
20:00			Josep Becerra 10', 65'; Alejandro Rabell 31'	Stadium: Complejo Recreativo de Guayama; Referee: Roberto Ortíz

December 8 8	Guaynabo Gol	2–0	Mirabelli SA	Bayamón
17:00	Samer Saleh 19', 48'			Stadium: Bayamón Soccer Complex; Referee: José R. Torres

December 9 8	Don Bosco FC	0–0	Metropolitan FA	Santurce
17:00				Stadium: Oratorio San Juan Bosco; Referee: Jairo Morales

December 9 8	Caguas Sporting FC	6–3	FC Mayagüez	Caguas
20:30	Alexis Tavárez 17'; Javier Irrizarry 26', 34'; Miguel Rivera 32', 45+2'; Joshua Rodríguez 87'		Kevin Martes 23'; Héctor Rivera 73'; Carlos Triani 90'	Stadium: Cancha Urbanización Villa del Rey; Referee: Oscar Hernández

=== Week 9 ===
December 15 9	Guayama FC	0–3	Don Bosco FC	Guayama
20:00			Dennis Beltré 13'; Shaquille Santos 40'; Marc Nieves 87'	Stadium: Complejo Área Recreativa de Guayama; Referee: William Anderson

December 15 9	Mirabelli SA	W-L	FC Mayagüez	Bayamón
				Stadium: Bayamón Soccer Complex

December 16 9	Caguas Sporting FC	4–2	Guaynabo Gol SC	Caguas
20:00	Miguel Rivera 1', 55'; Javier Irrizarry 5', 28'		Carlos Fernández 74'; Ángel Castro 83' (o.g.)	Referee: Roberto Ortíz

December 16 9	Metropolitan FA	2–0	Bayamón FC	San Juan
20:00	Karlos Ferrer 4'; Adrián Oviedo 49'			Referee: José R. Torres

=== Week 10 ===
January 12 10	FC Mayagüez	0–3	Guaynabo Gol SC	Mayagüez
20:00			Luis Estrella 81', 89'; Julian Ortíz 38'	Stadium: Mayagüez Athletics Stadium

January 12 10	Bayamón FC	3–3	Don Bosco FC	Bayamón
20:00	Andrés Cabrero 26'; Carlos Rosario 31'; Christian Niño 40'		Jorge Rivera 50'; Dennis Beltré 71', 90+6'	Stadium: Bayamón Soccer Complex

January 13 10	Metropolitan FA	2–1	Guayama FC	San Juan
18:00	Karlos Ferrer 10'; Adrián Oviedo 42'		José I. González 29'	Stadium: Estadio Reparto Metropolitano

January 13 10	Caguas Sporting FC	3–1	Mirabelli SA	Caguas
19:00	Javier Irizarry 41', 50'; Miguel Rivera 67'		Albert Ortíz 5'	Stadium: Estadio Villa del Rey

=== Week 11 ===
January 19 11	Bayamón FC	4–0	Mirabelli SA	Bayamón
20:00	Daniel Morales 12'; Carlos Rosario 58'; Christian Niño 60'; Josep Becerra 62'			Stadium: Bayamón Soccer Complex; Referee: Jairo Morales

January 19 11	Metropolitan FA	2–0	FC Mayagüez	San Juan
20:00	Karlos Ferrer 18'; Oscar Santana 35'			Stadium: Estadio Reparto Metropolitano; Referee: Roberto Ortíz

January 20 11	Guaynabo Gol SC	0–2	Guayama FC	Bayamón
19:00			Carlos Garay 19'; Samuel Soto 35'	Stadium: Bayamón Soccer Complex; Referee: William Anderson

January 20 11	Caguas Sporting FC	3–7	Don Bosco FC	Caguas
19:00	Joshua Rodríguez 23'; Miguel Rivera 40'; Javier Irizarry 57'		Dennis Beltré 37', 66', 72', 90'; Jorge Rivera 16', 69'; Marc Nieves 75'	Stadium: Estadio Villa del Rey; Referee: J. Raúl Rivera

=== Week 12 ===
January 26 12	Mirabelli SA	1–4	Don Bosco FC	Santurce
20:00	Dorian González 57'		Luis Adrián Calderón 31', 60'; Brian Rolón 85'; Dennis Beltré 90+2'	Stadium: Oratorio San Juan Boco

January 26 12	Guayama FC	6–4	FC Mayagüez	Guayama
20:00	José I. González 13', 41', 57', 90+1', 90+2'; Pedro Ortíz 88'		Xavier Del Valle 25'; Alberto Martin 59'; Kevin Martes 69'; Jeremy Roldán 82'	Stadium: Complejo Área Recreativa de Guayama

January 27 12	Caguas Sporting FC	0–3	Metropolitan FA	Caguas
19:00			José Ferrer 43'; Luis Rosario 62'; Adrián Oviedo 70'	Stadium: Estadio Villa del Rey

January 27 12	Guaynabo Gol SC	1–1	Bayamón FC	Bayamón
19:00	Rubén Jordán 66'		Andrés Cabrero 27'	Stadium: Bayamón Soccer Complex

=== Week 13 ===
February 2 13	Bayamón FC	3–0	FC Mayagüez	Bayamón
20:00	Carlos Rosario 31'; Alejandro Rabell 58'; Emmanuel D'Andrea 88'			Stadium: Bayamón Soccer Complex

February 2 13	Guayama FC	2–1	Caguas Sporting FC	Guayama
20:00	José I. González 22', 38'		Josue López 49'	Stadium: Complejo Área Recreativa de Guayama

February 3 13	Don Bosco FC	1–0	Guaynabo Gol	Santurce
19:00	Dennis Beltré 9'			Stadium: Oratorio San Juan Bosco

February 3 13	Metropolitan FA	5–3	Mirabelli SA	San Juan
16:00	Adrián Oviedo 21', 30', 76'; Karlos Ferrer 25'; Norman Quilichini 90+3'			Stadium: Estadio Reparto Metropolitano

=== Week 14 ===
February 9 14	Guaynabo Gol	1–3	Metropolitan FA	Caguas
20:00	Rubén Jordán 63'		Karlos Ferrer 28'; Adrián Oviedo 47'; Norman Quilichini 75'	Stadium: Parque Urbanización Villa del Rey

February 9 14	Mirabelli SA	1–2	Guayama FC	Santurce
20:00	Victor Pinto 87' (o.g.)		Carlos Garay 16'; José I. González 64'	Stadium: Oratorio San Juan Bosco

February 10 14	FC Mayagüez	3–0	Don Bosco FC	Mayagüez
17:00	Carlos Triani 72'; Andrés Sandoval 78'; Eduardo Rosado 82'			Stadium: Mayagüez Athletics Stadium

February 10 14	Bayamón FC	5–0	Caguas Sporting FC	Bayamón
16:00	Josep Becerra 3', 63'; Andrés Cabrero 35'; Alejandro Rabell 74', 75'			Stadium: Bayamón Soccer Complex

=== Week 15 ===
February 16 15	Guayama FC	5–5	Bayamón FC	Guayama
20:00	Juan Vélez 6'; Emmanuel Torres 36', 49'; José I. González 70'; Félix Dawson 84'		Andrés Cabrero 7'; Josep Becerra 38', 45+1', 76'; Carlos Rosario 55'	Stadium: Complejo Área Recreativa de Guayama

February 16 15	Guaynabo Gol SC	3–1	Mirabelli SA	Caguas
20:00	Samer Saleh 13'; Julián Ortíz 53'; Jonathan Genera 60'		Francisco Berdasco 90'	Stadium: Mickey Jiménez

February 17 15	Don Bosco FC	1–1	Metropolitan FA	Santurce
17:00	Dennis Beltré 84'		Adrián Oviedo 83'	Stadium: Oratorio San Juan Bosco

February 17 15	Caguas Sporting FC	2–2	FC Mayagüez	Caguas
20:00	Rolando López 54'; Sergio Yris 64'		Jeremy Roldán 19'; Kevin Martes 23'	Stadium: Cancha Urbanización Villa del Rey

=== Week 16 ===
February 23 16	Guayama FC	1–2	Don Bosco FC	Guayama
20:00	Juan Vélez 64'		Héctor Ramos 37'; Jorge Rivera 41'	Stadium: Complejo Área Recreativa de Guayama

February 23 16	Guaynabo Gol SC	2–1	Caguas Sporting FC	Bayamón
20:00				Stadium: Bayamón Soccer Complex

February 24 16	Bayamón FC	2–0	Metropolitan FA	Bayamón
19:00	Josep Becerra 64', 73'			Stadium: Bayamón Soccer Complex

February 24 16	FC Mayagüez	3–2	Mirabelli SA	Mayagüez
16:00	Adrián Cruz 30', 62'; Andrés Sandoval 44'		Fernando Quintero 8'; Francisco Berdasco 56'	Stadium: Mayagüez Athletics Stadium

=== Week 17 ===
March 2 17	Don Bosco FC	0–4	Bayamón FC	Santurce
20:00			Christian Niño 7'; Josep Becerra 53'; Emmanuel D'Andrea 77'; Javier De La Rosa 87'	Stadium: Oratorio San Juan Bosco

March 2 17	Metropolitan FA	3–2	Guayama FC	San Juan
20:00	Marcos Ortíz 9'; Marcelo Rodríguez 44', 47'		Emmanuel Torres 32', 87'	Stadium: Estadio Reparto Metropolitano

March 3 17	FC Mayagüez	3–2	Guaynabo Gol SC	Mayagüez
16:00				Stadium: Mayagüez Athletics Stadium

March 3 17	Mirabelli SA	0–1	Caguas Sporting FC	Santurce
17:00			José Negrón 64'	Stadium: Oratorio San Juan Bosco

=== Week 18 ===
March 9 18	Mirabelli SA	2–7	Bayamón FC	Santurce
20:00	Albert Ortíz 20'; Jeriel Meléndez 52'		Alejandro Rabell 34', 44'; Jorge Rosa 37', 75', 79'; Josep Becerra 82'; Juan Carlos Rodríguez 85'	Stadium: Oratorio San Juan Bosco

March 9 18	Guayama FC	2–0	Guaynabo Gol SC	Guayama
20:00	Emmanuel Torres 27'; José I. González 59'		Emmanuel Torres 32', 87'	Stadium: Complejo Área Recreativa de Guayama

March 10 18	Metropolitan FA	4–0	FC Mayagüez	San Juan
17:00	Adrián Oviedo 31'; Norman Quilichini 47'; Karlos Ferrer 11', 74'			Stadium: Estadio Reparto Metropolitano

March 10 18	Caguas Sporting FC	1–5	Don Bosco FC	Caguas
19:00	Josué López 16'		Héctor Ramos 45'; Shaquille Santos 66'; Jorge Rivera 30', 46', 73'	Stadium: Parque Urbanización Villa del Rey

=== Week 19 ===
March 16 19	Bayamón FC	1–1	Guaynabo Gol	Bayamón
20:00	Josep Becerra 6'		Lorenzo Báez 78'	Stadium: Bayamón Soccer Complex

March 16 19	Don Bosco FC	4–0	Mirabelli SA	Guayama
20:00	Dennis Beltré 4', 10'; Héctor Ramos 22'; Jorge Rivera 90+1'		Emmanuel Torres 32', 87'	Stadium: Complejo Área Recreativa de Guayama

March 17 19	FC Mayagüez	1–5	Guayama FC	Mayagüez
17:00	Andrés Sandoval 84'		Emmanuel Torres 19'; José I. González 7', 59'; Axel Burgos 49', 67'	Stadium: Mayagüez Athletics Stadium

March 10 19	Caguas Sporting FC	2–8	Metropolitan FA	Caguas
19:00	José Potter 62'; Miguel Rivera 67'		Karlos Ferrer 4', 30'; Antonio Enright 36'; Jahismael García 70'; Agusto Giménez 87'; Christian Vargas 44', 48', 90'	Stadium: Parque Urbanización Villa del Rey

=== Week 20 ===
March 30 20	Metropolitan FA	3–2	Guaynabo Gol	San Juan
20:00	Marcelo Rodríguez 15'; Adrián Oviedo 25'; Karlos Ferrer 54'		José Rodríguez 25'; Julián Ortíz 45'	Stadium: Estadio Reparto Metropolitano

March 30 20	Don Bosco FC	7–1	FC Mayagüez	Santurce
20:00	Héctor Ramos 11', 43', 60'; Dennis Beltré 17', 66', 76', 88'		Andrés Sandoval 79'	Stadium: Oratorio San Juan Bosco

March 31 20	Mirabelli SA	0–3	Guayama FC	Santurce
17:00			Marcos Martínez 27'; Juan Vélez 53'; Emmanuel Torres 64'	Stadium: Oratorio San Juan Bosco

March 31 20	Caguas Sporting FC	0–3	Bayamón FC	Bayamón
21:00			Alejandro Rabell 8', 78'; Andrés Cabrero 83'	Stadium: Bayamón Soccer Complex
Note: Game was originally scheduled to be played on Caguas, but weather conditions forced it to move to Bayamón. Caguas Sporting FC played as Home.

=== Week 21 ===
April 6 21	Guayama FC	4–1	Caguas Sporting FC	Guayama
20:00	Emmanuel Torres 26'; Carlos G. Garay 34'; Samuel Soto 58', 88'		Miguel Rivera 39'	Stadium: Complejo Área Recreativa de Guayama

April 6 21	Mirabelli SA	1–4	Metropolitan FA	Santurce
20:00	Jeriel Meléndez 37'		Marcelo Rodríguez 44', 60'; Jahismael García 62'; Christian Vargas 87'	Stadium: Oratorio San Juan Bosco

April 7 21	Bayamón FC	10–0	FC Mayagüez	Bayamón
19:00	Andrés Cabrero 35', 86'; Emmanuel D'Andrea 39'; José Cortés 45'; Alejandro Rabell 50', 52', 69', 83'; Juan Carlos Rodríguez 90'			Stadium: Bayamón Soccer Complex

April 7 21	Guaynabo Gol SC	2–6	Don Bosco FC	Bayamón
22:00			Marc Nieves 33'; Jayson Concepción 64'; Dennis Beltré 47', 70', 76'; Jorge Rivera 86'	Stadium: Bayamón Soccer Complex

== Playoffs ==
Quarterfinals
4	Guayama FC	2	4	6
5	Caguas Sporting FC	2	1	3
3	Don Bosco FC	2	4	6
6	Guaynabo Gol SC	4	1	5

Semifinals
1	Metropolitan FA	2	3	5
4	Guayama FC	1	0	1
2	Bayamón FC	6	3	9
3	Don Bosco FC	2	4	6

Final
1	Metropolitan FA	0 (4)
2	Bayamón FC	0 (1)

=== Quarterfinals Leg 1 ===
April 14 Quarterfinals	Guaynabo Gol SC	4–2	Don Bosco FC	Bayamón
19:00	Ryan López 21', 32'; Lorenzo Báez 39'; José G. Rodríguez 62'		Héctor Ramos 10', 75'	Stadium: Bayamón Soccer Complex

April 14 Quarterfinals	Caguas Sporting FC	2–2	Guayama FC	Caguas
19:00	José López 47'; Miguel Rivera 73'		José I. González 38'; Emmanuel Torres 61'	Stadium: Parque Urbanización Villa del Rey

=== Quarterfinals Leg 2 ===
April 27 Quarterfinals	Don Bosco FC	4–1	Guaynabo Gol SC	Santurce
20:00	Marc Nieves 46'; Jorge Rivera 58'; Héctor Ramos 75'; Dennis Beltré 90'		Julián Ortíz 42'	Stadium: Oratorio San Juan Bosco

April 27 Quarterfinals	Guayama FC	4–1	Caguas Sporting FC	Guayama
20:00	Emmanuel Torres 17'; Samuel Soto 26'; Axel Burgos 53'; Marcos Martínez 88'		Alexis Tavárez 8'	Stadium: Complejo del Área Recreativa de Guayama

=== Semifinals Leg 1 ===
May 1 Semifinal	Guayama FC	1–2	Metropolitan FA	Guayama
8:30 PM	Marcos Martínez 81'	Report	José Ferrer 27', 31'	Stadium: Complejo del Área Recreativa de Guayama

May 1 Semifinal	Don Bosco FC	2–6	Bayamón FC
8:30 PM	Héctor Ramos 42'; Bryan Alicea 61'	Report	Alejandro Rabell 27', 36', 79', 90+1'; Alberto Díaz 41'; Own Goal 85'

=== Semifinals Leg 2 ===
May 4 Semifinal	Metropolitan FA	3–0	Guayama FC	San Juan
8:00 PM	Luis Delgado 10'; Karlos Ferrer 39'; Jaime Díaz 79'	Report		Stadium: Estadio Reparto Metropolitano

May 4 Semifinal	Bayamón FC	3–4	Don Bosco FC	Bayamón
8:00 PM	Josep Becerra 9', 51'; Carlos Rosario 23'	Report	Héctor Ramos 11'; Jorge Rivera 16', 71'; Emmanuel Cruz 75'	Stadium: Bayamón Soccer Complex

=== Final ===
May 11 Semifinal	Metropolitan FA	0–0 (4–1 p)	Bayamón FC	Bayamón
3:30 PM		Report		Stadium: Juan Ramón Loubriel Stadium

LPR Champions
Metropolitan FA
1st title

== Season statistics ==
=== Scoring ===
- First goal of the season:
  (Puerto Rico) Antonio Enright for Metropolitan FA against Don Bosco FC (29 September 2018)
- 100th goal of the season:
  (Spain) Josep Becerra for Bayamón FC against Caguas Sporting FC (27 November 2018)
- 200th goal of the season:
  (Puerto Rico) Rubén Jordan for Guaynabo Gol against Bayamón FC (27 January 2019)
- 300th goal of the season:
  (Puerto Rico) Jorge Rivera for Don Bosco FC against Caguas Sporting FC (10 March 2019)

=== Top goalscorers ===
Rank	Player	Club	Goals
1	(Spain) Josep Becerra	Bayamón FC	32
2	(Puerto Rico) Dennis Beltré	Don Bosco FC	22
3	(Puerto Rico) José I. González	Guayama FC	20
4	(Puerto Rico) Alejandro Rabell	Bayamón FC	19
5	(Argentina) Adrián Oviedo	Metropolitan FA	16
6	(Puerto Rico) Karlos Ferrer	Metropolitan FA	13
6	(Puerto Rico) Miguel Rivera	Caguas Sporting FC	13
8	(Puerto Rico) Jorge Rivera	Don Bosco FC	12
9	(Puerto Rico) Hector Ramos	Don Bosco FC	11
10	(Puerto Rico) Emmanuel Torres	Guayama FC	10

Source Liga Puerto Rico

=== Top assists ===
Rank	Player	Club	Assists
1	(Spain) Josep Becerra	Bayamón FC	8
2	(Puerto Rico) Samuel Soto	Guayama FC	7
2	(Puerto Rico) Andrés Cabrero	Bayamón FC	7
3	(Puerto Rico) Juan Vélez	Guayama FC	4

Assist until matches played at January 20, 2019

=== Clean Sheets ===
Rank	Goalkeeper	Club	Clean Sheets
1	(Puerto Rico) Leftie Millán	Bayamón FC	7
2	(Puerto Rico) Christopher Echevarría	Metropolitan FA	6
3	(Argentina) Sebastián Uranga	Guaynabo Gol SC	4
4	(Puerto Rico) Steven Olivera	Don Bosco FC	3
4	(Puerto Rico) Edgar L. Colón	Caguas Sporting FC	3
5	(Puerto Rico) Ian Mercado	Bayamón FC	2
5	(Puerto Rico) Omar Torres	Guayama FC	2
