= Superior Femenino de la Liga Puerto Rico =

Professional women's association football league based in Puerto Rico

- Organizing body: Puerto Rican Football Federation
- Founded: 2018
- Country: Puerto Rico
- Confederation: CONCACAF
- Number of clubs: 6
- Level on pyramid: 1
- Current champion(s): Caribbean Stars FC (6th title) (Clausura 2026)
- Most championships: Caribbean Stars FC (6th title)
- Broadcasters: Live Streaming; YouTube: Liga Puerto Rico Pro
- Sponsor: La PR
- Website: ligapuertorico.com
- Current: 2026–27 Apertura

The Superior Femenino de la Liga Puerto Rico is a women's football competition organized by the Puerto Rican Football Federation that currently is the top division football league in the island. It was announced via Facebook by the Federation in August 2018.

== History ==
=== Liga PR Femenino ===
In 2018, the league was established. While the league did foster some success, it does not have a major sponsor and lacks media coverage. The League would live streamed matches on their official Liga Puerto Rico Pro YouTube Channel.

== Women's teams ==
Locations of the current 2026 Apertura Season of Superior Femenino de la Liga Puerto Rico clubs

=== Current clubs ===
The following six teams participate in the women's Apertura 2026 competition.

Team	City	Stadium	Capacity	Founded	Joined	President	Coach
Caribbean Stars FC	Caguas	Caribbean Stars Campo de Fútbol Recreo-deportivo del Este	1,000	2009	2021	Bernice Nieto	Oscar Nieto
Club de Fútbol Fraigcomar	San Juan	Estadio San Francisco	2,000	1986	2018	Antonio Pirillo	Elgy Morales
Puerto Rico Surf SC	Guaynabo	Complejo Deportivo Torrimar	1,000	2020	2022	Marco Velez	Javier Torres
Guaynabo FC	Guaynabo	Guaynabo FC Soccer Field	1,000	2023	2025		Sebastián Uranga
Escalante F.C.	Fajardo	FIFA Forward Facility (Playa Añasco)	1,000	2013	2026	John Omos	Leonardo Acevedo Agron
Coamo FC	Coamo	Velódromo Panamericano de Coamo	3,000	2011	2018	Reinaldo Colón Aponte	Reinaldo Colón Aponte

=== Former clubs ===
Team	City	Stadium	Capacity	Founded	Joined	Left
Guaynabo Gol SC	Guaynabo	Oratorio San Juan Bosco, Cantera, Santurce	200	2007	2018	2023
Puerto Rico Sol	Mayagüez	Mayagüez Athletics Stadium	12,175	2017	2018	2024
Puerto Rico Bayamón	Bayamón	Bayamón Soccer Complex	1,000	1999	2018	2022
Metropolitan FA	San Juan	Parque Reparto Metropolitano	400	2015	2018	2023
Leal Arecibo	Arecibo	University of Puerto Rico at Arecibo	200	2006	2018	2023
Challengers SC	Fajardo	Fajardo Soccer Stadium	3,000	2013	2018	2019
SPADI	San Juan	University of Puerto Rico at Río Piedras	300	2001	2018	2019
Mirabelli SA	San Juan	Parque Reparto Metropolitano	200	2010	2018	2019
Valencianas CBJ	Juncos	Colegio Corazon De Maria	200	2004	2018	2019
Aguilas de Añasco	Añasco	Albergue Olímpico	200	2004	2018	2019

- Guaynabo Gol SC rebranded as Guaynabo FC.

== Champions ==
Season	Champions
Apertura 2018	Puerto Rico Sol FC (women) (1)
Clausura 2019	Puerto Rico Sol FC (women) (2)
Clausura 2020	no title awarded
Clausura 2021	Puerto Rico Sol FC (women) (3)
Clausura 2022	Puerto Rico Sol FC (women) (4)
Apertura 2022	Puerto Rico Sol FC (women) (5)
Clausura 2023	Caribbean Stars FC (1)
Apertura 2023	Caribbean Stars FC (2)
Clausura 2024	
Apertura 2024	
Clausura 2025	Caribbean Stars FC (4)
Apertura 2025	Caribbean Stars FC (5)
Clausura 2026	Caribbean Stars FC (6)
Apertura 2026	Current Season
Clausura 2027	
