= 2014 CFU Club Championship =

2014 CFU Club Champions’ Cup

Tournament details
- Dates: March 21–25, 2014 (first round); April 18–20, 2014 (final round; cancelled)
- Teams: 13 (from 9 associations)

Tournament statistics
- Matches played: 15
- Goals scored: 40 (2.67 per match)
- Top scorer: 9 players (2 goals each)

The 2014 CFU Club Championship was the 16th edition of CFU Club Championship, the annual international club football competition in the Caribbean region, held amongst clubs whose football associations are affiliated with the Caribbean Football Union (CFU). The top three teams in the tournament qualified for the 2014–15 CONCACAF Champions League.

== Teams ==
The tournament was open to all champion and runners-up from each member association’s league, once their competition ended on or before the end of 2013. Registration for all interested clubs closed on December 31, 2013. CONCACAF broadened the possibilities for participation and further indicated that the competition was not limited to professional clubs only. Therefore, clubs with amateur status were also eligible for participation.

A total of 13 teams from 9 CFU associations entered the competition. Valencia (Haiti) was given a bye to the final round as the best performer among the entrants both in the 2013 CFU Club Championship and the 2013–14 CONCACAF Champions League. The other 12 teams entered the first round.

Association	Team	Qualification method
Cayman Islands	Bodden Town	2012–13 Cayman Islands League champion
Curaçao	Centro Dominguito	2013 Curaçao League champion
Guadeloupe	USR	2012–13 Guadeloupe Division d'Honneur fourth place (entered after both CS Moulien and L'Etoile, the league champion and runner-up respectively, declined to enter)
Guyana	Alpha United	2012–13 GFF National Super League champion
Haiti	Mirebalais	2013 Ligue Haïtienne champion
Haiti	Valencia (bye to final round)	2013 Ligue Haïtienne runner-up
Jamaica	Harbour View FC	2012–13 National Premier League champion
Jamaica	Waterhouse	2012–13 National Premier League runner-up
Puerto Rico	Bayamón FC	2013 Liga Nacional de Fútbol de Puerto Rico regular season winner and championship play-off runner-up
Suriname	Inter Moengotapoe	2012–13 SVB Hoofdklasse champion
Suriname	Notch	2012–13 SVB Hoofdklasse runner-up
Trinidad and Tobago	Defence Force	2012–13 TT Pro League champion
Trinidad and Tobago	Caledonia AIA	2012–13 TT Pro League runner-up

The following associations did not enter a team:

- Anguilla
- Antigua and Barbuda
- Aruba
- (The Bahamas) Bahamas
- Barbados
- Bermuda
- Bonaire
- British Virgin Islands
- Cuba
- Dominica
- Dominican Republic
- French Guiana
- Grenada
- Martinique
- Montserrat
- Saint Kitts and Nevis
- Saint Lucia
- (Collectivity of Saint Martin) Saint-Martin
- Saint Vincent and the Grenadines
- Sint Maarten
- Turks and Caicos Islands
- United States Virgin Islands

== First round ==
In the first round, the 12 teams were divided into three groups of four, with each group containing at least two league champions. Each group was played on a round-robin basis, hosted by one of the teams at a centralized venue. The winners of each group advanced to the final round to join Valencia.

=== Group 1 ===
- Hosted by Bayamón FC in Puerto Rico (all times UTC−4).

Team	Pld	W	D	L	GF	GA	GD	Pts
(Puerto Rico) Bayamón FC	3	1	2	0	6	1	+5	5
(Curaçao) Centro Dominguito	3	1	2	0	4	2	+2	5
(Guadeloupe) USR	3	1	2	0	2	1	+1	5
(Cayman Islands) Bodden Town	3	0	0	3	2	10	−8	0

March 21, 2014
17:00

Centro Dominguito (Curaçao)	0–0	(Guadeloupe) USR
	Report

Juan Ramón Loubriel Stadium, Bayamón
Referee: Sandy Vásquez (Dominican Republic)
March 21, 2014
20:00

Bayamón FC (Puerto Rico)	5–0	(Cayman Islands) Bodden Town
Ramos 9'; Granado 28' (pen.), 61'; Pérez 35'; Calix 79'	Report

Juan Ramón Loubriel Stadium, Bayamón
Referee: Valdin Legister (Jamaica)

March 23, 2014
15:30

USR (Guadeloupe)	1–0	(Cayman Islands) Bodden Town
Barbosa 82'	Report

Juan Ramón Loubriel Stadium, Bayamón
Referee: Johannes Dolaini (Suriname)
March 23, 2014
18:30

Bayamón FC (Puerto Rico)	0–0	(Curaçao) Centro Dominguito
	Report

Juan Ramón Loubriel Stadium, Bayamón
Referee: Sherwin Johnson (Guyana)

March 25, 2014
17:00

Bodden Town (Cayman Islands)	2–4	(Curaçao) Centro Dominguito
Levien 35'; Robinson 58'	Report	Reid 3'; Bush 50' (o.g.); Shayron 52', 71'

Juan Ramón Loubriel Stadium, Bayamón
Referee: Sandy Vásquez (Dominican Republic)
March 25, 2014
20:00

Bayamón FC (Puerto Rico)	1–1	(Guadeloupe) USR
Vélez 55'	Report	Roman 90+2'

Juan Ramón Loubriel Stadium, Bayamón
Referee: Valdin Legister (Jamaica)

=== Group 2 ===
- Hosted by Mirebalais in Haiti (all times UTC−4).

Team	Pld	W	D	L	GF	GA	GD	Pts
(Jamaica) Waterhouse	3	3	0	0	10	1	+9	9
(Trinidad and Tobago) Caledonia AIA	3	1	1	1	5	6	−1	4
(Haiti) Mirebalais	3	1	0	2	3	6	−3	3
(Suriname) Inter Moengotapoe	3	0	1	2	3	8	−5	1

March 21, 2014
17:00

Waterhouse (Jamaica)	4–0	(Suriname) Inter Moengotapoe
Francoeur 44'; Campbell 83'; Benjamin 84'; Samuels 90'	Report

Parc Bayas, Mirebalais
Referee: Trevor Taylor (Barbados)
March 21, 2014
19:00

Mirebalais (Haiti)	0–3	(Trinidad and Tobago) Caledonia AIA
	Report	Edwards 29'; Muhammad 38'; Charles 84'

Parc Bayas, Mirebalais
Attendance: 3,000
Referee: William Anderson (Puerto Rico)

March 23, 2014
16:00

Inter Moengotapoe (Suriname)	2–2	(Trinidad and Tobago) Caledonia AIA
Amoeferie 48'; Kwasie 76'	Report	Muhammad 61'; Charles 72'

Parc Bayas, Mirebalais
Referee: Wilson Da Costa (Bahamas)
March 23, 2014
18:00

Mirebalais (Haiti)	1–2	(Jamaica) Waterhouse
Joseph 66'	Report	Valreius 1' (o.g.); Howell 49'

Parc Bayas, Mirebalais
Referee: Leo Clarke (Saint Lucia)

March 25, 2014
16:00

Caledonia AIA (Trinidad and Tobago)	0–4	(Jamaica) Waterhouse
	Report	Howell 34'; Campbell 50'; Benjamin 78'; Brissett 87'

Parc Bayas, Mirebalais
Referee: Leo Clarke (Saint Lucia)
March 25, 2014
18:00

Mirebalais (Haiti)	2–1	(Suriname) Inter Moengotapoe
Gauthier 45'; Mendes 69'	Report	Maasie 31'

Parc Bayas, Mirebalais
Attendance: 2,500
Referee: Trevor Taylor (Barbados)

=== Group 3 ===
- Hosted by Harbour View FC in Jamaica (all times UTC−5).

Team	Pld	W	D	L	GF	GA	GD	Pts
(Guyana) Alpha United	2	2	0	0	3	0	+3	6
(Trinidad and Tobago) Defence Force	2	1	0	1	2	2	0	3
(Jamaica) Harbour View FC	2	0	0	2	0	3	−3	0

- (Suriname) Notch withdrew.
March 21, 2014
19:30

Alpha United (Guyana)	2–0	(Trinidad and Tobago) Defence Force
Murray 20'; Bain 48'	Report

Harbour View Stadium, Harbour View
Referee: Christophel Stewart (Cayman Islands)

March 23, 2014
19:30

Harbour View FC (Jamaica)	0–1	(Guyana) Alpha United
	Report	Bain 24'

Harbour View Stadium, Harbour View
Referee: Yadel Martínez (Cuba)

March 25, 2014
19:30

Harbour View FC (Jamaica)	0–2	(Trinidad and Tobago) Defence Force
	Report	Jorsling 55', 86'

Harbour View Stadium, Harbour View
Referee: Alain Georges (Haiti)

== Final round ==
Under the original plan for the final round, the four teams would play matches on a knock-out basis, hosted by one of the teams at a centralized venue. The semifinal winners would play in the final while the losers would play in the third place match. Both finalists and the winner of the third place match would qualify for the 2014–15 CONCACAF Champions League.

On March 31, 2014, the CFU announced that Valencia, which were given a bye to the final round, could not participate in the competition after the Haitian Football Federation failed to confirm the club as an active member of the federation due to a fallout between the club and the federation. After consultation with CONCACAF and the three first round group winners which were to play with Valencia in the final round, the three group winners, Bayamón FC, Waterhouse, and Alpha United, were chosen to represent the CFU in the 2014–15 CONCACAF Champions League, subject to the clubs meeting the minimum standards for participation. Moreover, the final round was cancelled to save expenses for the three teams.

=== Semifinals ===
April 18, 2014

Bayamón FC (Puerto Rico)	Cancelled	(Jamaica) Waterhouse

April 18, 2014

Valencia (Haiti)	Cancelled	(Guyana) Alpha United

=== Third place match ===
April 20, 2014

Loser Semifinal 1	Cancelled	Loser Semifinal 2

=== Final ===
April 20, 2014

Winner Semifinal 1	Cancelled	Winner Semifinal 2

Bayamón FC, Waterhouse, and Alpha United qualified for the 2014–15 CONCACAF Champions League.

== Top goalscorers ==
Rank	Player	Team	Goals
1	(Colombia) Yoximar Granado	(Puerto Rico) Bayamón FC	2
1	(Curaçao) Bernardus Shayron	(Curaçao) Centro Dominguito	2
1	(Grenada) Kithson Bain	(Guyana) Alpha United	2
1	(Jamaica) Juvaune Benjamin	(Jamaica) Waterhouse	2
1	(Jamaica) Romario Campbell	(Jamaica) Waterhouse	2
1	(Jamaica) Kenroy Howell	(Jamaica) Waterhouse	2
1	(Trinidad and Tobago) Tyrone Charles	(Trinidad and Tobago) Caledonia AIA	2
1	(Trinidad and Tobago) Nuru Abdullah Muhammad	(Trinidad and Tobago) Caledonia AIA	2
1	(Trinidad and Tobago) Devorn Jorsling	(Trinidad and Tobago) Defence Force	2
