= 2013 Liga Nacional de Fútbol de Puerto Rico =

Fifth season of Puerto Rico's top-division football league

Liga Nacional de Fútbol de Puerto Rico
- Season: 2013
- Matches played: 12
- Goals scored: 50 (4.17 per match)
- Biggest home win: Bayamon FC; 10 – 0 Leones de Maunabo
- Highest scoring: Bayamon FC; 10 – 0 Leones de Maunabo

The 2013 Liga Nacional de Fútbol de Puerto Rico is the fifth season of Puerto Rico's top-division football league. The regular season ran from April to September 2013.

== Teams ==
Club	Home city	Stadium
Bayamon FC	Bayamon	Juan Ramon Loubriel Stadium
Criollos de Caguas FC	Caguas	Polideportivo Villa del Rey 1era
Alianza Indios Yaguez	Mayagüez	Mayagüez Athletics Stadium
Leones de Maunabo	Maunabo	
Quintana FC	San Juan	Complejo Deportivo Quintana
Sevilla FC	San Juan	Estadio Sixto Escobar
Guayama FC	Guayama	Parque Roberto Monroig
Universitarios FC	San Juan	Campo de la Universidad de Puerto Rico
Atléticos de Levittown FC	Toa Baja	Parque Atlético de Levittown

== Standings ==
Pos	Team	Pld	W	D	L	GF	GA	GD	Pts	Qualification
1	Bayamón FC	16	13	2	1	57	9	+48	41	2014 CFU Club Championship
2	Sevilla FC	16	11	3	2	52	19	+33	36	
3	Criollos de Caguas FC	16	10	3	3	35	14	+21	33	
4	Quintana FC	16	9	3	4	42	30	+12	30	
5	Guayama FC	15	7	1	7	39	29	+10	22	
6	Universitarios FC	16	5	2	9	24	35	−11	17	
7	Atléticos de Levittown FC	16	4	1	11	21	55	−34	13	
8	Leones de Maunabo	15	4	0	11	19	44	−25	12	
9	Alianza Indios Yaguez	16	0	1	15	5	59	−54	1	

Source: FIFA.com
Rules for classification: 1) points; 2) goal difference; 3) number of goals scored.

== Results ==
=== Match-day 1 ===
5 April 2013
8:00 PM

Bayamon FC	4 – 0	Quintana FC
Samuel Soto 29' (pen.); Carlos Martin 73' 90+1' 90+3'	Report

Juan Ramon Loubriel Stadium
Attendance: 200

6 April 2013
6:00 PM

Guayama FC	3 – 0	Universitarios FC
Edgardo Lebron; Joseph Rivera; Marcos Martinez

6 April 2013
8:00 PM

Sevilla FC	5 – 0	Alianza Indios Yaguez
Juan Vélez 3'; Noah Delgado 5'; Aiman 57'; Pedro Chacon 65'; Eloy Matos 76'	Report

Sixto Escobar

7 April 2013
6:00 PM

Criollos de Caguas FC	3 – 2	Atléticos de Levittown FC
Andres Cabrero 42' 60'; Javier Irizarry 52'		Esteban Torres 21'; Carlos Aristazabal 36'

Polideportivo Villa del Rey 1era
Attendance: 100

=== Match-day 2 ===
13 April 2013
8:00 PM

Atléticos de Levittown FC	4 – 1	Leones de Maunabo
Chago Matos 25' 34'; Carlos Aristazabal 49'; Esteban Torres 57'	Report	Axel Burgos 36'

Parque Atlético de Levittown

13 April 2013
8:00 PM

Sevilla FC	2 – 2	Quintana FC
Caleb Norkus 2'; Eloy Matos 36'	Report	Hector Ramos 13' 33'

Complejo Deportivo Quintana
Attendance: 50

14 April 2013
6:00 PM

Universitarios FC	1 – 1	Alianza Indios Yaguez
José Santaella 47'	Report	Fernando Martínez 27'

Juan Ramon Loubriel Stadium

14 April 2013
6:00 PM

Criollos de Caguas FC	3 – 0	Guayama FC
Jonathan Correa 51' 67'; Andres Cabrero 59'	Report

Polideportivo Villa del Rey 1era
Attendance: 300

=== Match-day 3 ===
19 April 2013
8:00 PM

Atléticos de Levittown FC	3 – 2	Universitarios FC
Esteban Torres 30'; Carlos Lain 40'; Elías Llabres 53'		Félix Figueroa 84'; Cristian Laracuente 90+2'

Juan Ramon Loubriel Stadium

20 April 2013
8:00 PM

Bayamon FC	10 – 0	Leones de Maunabo
Jean Charles Canès 13'; Jonathan Sánchez 24'; Stanley Guirand 29' 67'; Anthony Martínez 45+1' 52'; Yveson Etienne 55'; Carlos Martin 62' 69' 90+1' (pen.)

Juan Ramon Loubriel Stadium

20 April 2013
8:00 PM

Quintana FC	Postponed	Alianza Indios Yaguez

Complejo Deportivo Quintana

21 April 2013
4:00 PM

Sevilla FC	3 – 1	Guayama FC
Aiman 22'; Pedro Chacon 66'; 86' (o.g.)		Alexis Medina 35'

Universidad de Puerto Rico

=== Match-day 4 ===
27 April 2013
8:00 PM

Sevilla FC	0 – 0	Atléticos de Levittown FC

27 April 2013
8:00 PM

Alianza Indios Yaguez	Postponed	Bayamon FC

Mayagüez Athletics Stadium

28 April 2013
6:00 PM

Criollos de Caguas FC	v	Leones de Maunabo

Juan Ramon Loubriel Stadium

28 April 2013
6:00 PM

Quintana FC	v	Guayama FC

Complejo Deportivo Quintana
