= Puerto Rico Sol FC (women) =

Puerto Rican association football club from Mayagüez

- Full name: Puerto Rico Sol Futbol Club
- Founded: 2017
- Stadium: Mayagüez Athletics Stadium; Mayagüez, Puerto Rico
- Capacity: 12,175
- Manager: Shek Borkowski
- League: Liga Puerto Rico
- 2022: Champion
- Website: https://www.ligapuertorico.com/team/puerto-rico-sol-f-c/
Home colors	Away colors

Puerto Rico Sol FC was a Puerto Rican association football club based in Mayagüez. The club was a member of the Liga Puerto Rico, the highest level of football in the country. The Sol women’s team was recognized as a model for the development of women's football, both in economic and in cultural terms. Sol hosted its matches at the Estadio Centroamericano de Mayagüez, a stadium of capacity 12,175. The team were the defending champions, having won the Liga PR in 2019, 2021, 2022. After the end of the 2022 season the club didn’t return to play and therefore it disappeared.

== History ==
Puerto Rico Sol FC was founded in 2016 by Shek Borkowski with Jose Luis Perez Torres joining in 2017. Borkowski, a native of Poland, also previously founded FC Indiana and Chicago Red Stars.

Sol joined the Liga PR in August 2018. The club won Liga PR championship in 2021 defeating Caribbean Stars 4-2 in the final. In 2022, Sol defeated Caribbean Stars 3-1 to win its third consecutive Liga PR championship.

== Year-by-year ==
Year	Division	League	Reg. Season	Playoffs
2018/19	1	Liga PR	1st	Champion
2019/20	1	Liga PR	1st	Abandoned
2021	1	Liga PR	1st	Champion
2022	1	Liga PR	1st	Champion

== Honors ==
=== Domestic competitions ===
==== League titles ====
- Liga Puerto Rico (4): 2019, 2021, 2022 Apertura, 2022 Clausura

== Management team ==
As of 19 July 2021

Position	Staff
Manager	(Poland) Shek Borkowski
Goalkeeping coach	(France) Jean Vivoni
Assistant coach	(Ecuador) Christian Castro
Opposition analyst & coach	(Puerto Rico) Hernan Lopez

Source: Puerto Rico Sol

== Past squad ==
As of 20 June 2023.

Note: Flags indicate national team as defined under FIFA eligibility rules; some limited exceptions apply. Players may hold more than one non-FIFA nationality.

No.	Pos.	Nation	Player
1	GK	MEX	Jaqueline Cataño
2	DF	PUR	Veronica García
3	DF	USA	Ashley Dozier
4	DF	USA	Mackenzie Reuber
5	DF	PUR	Madison Cox
6	MF	MEX	Jazmin Ramos
7	MF	USA	TBA
8	MF	PUR	Natasha Fowler-Varon
9	FW	USA	Addison Steiner
10	MF	USA	Marissa DiGenova

No.	Pos.	Nation	Player
11	MF	USA	Kia Jacobs
12	FW	USA	Ashlynn Jones
13	MF	PUR	Jazira Gonzalez
14	MF	PUR	Lisamary Acosta
15	DF	PUR	TBA
16	MF	PUR	TBA
17	FW	USA	Amber Baca
18	FW	PUR	Lara Soto
19	MF	PUR	Dani Ortiz
20	GK	PUR	Amanda Ríos

== Stadium ==
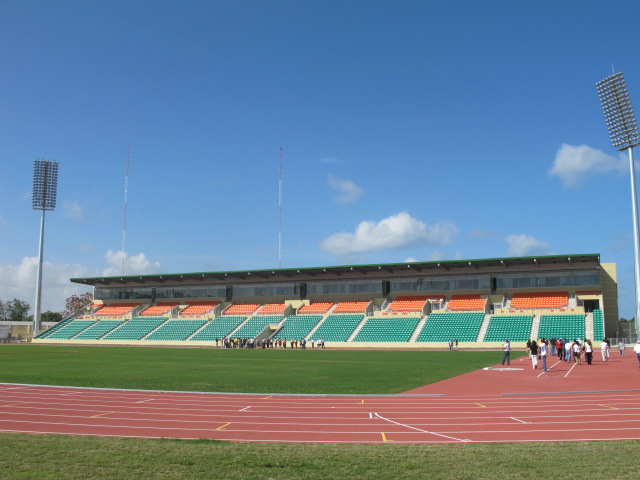
Mayagüez Athletics Stadium, the club's current venue

For the 2018-19 Liga Puerto Rico season, Sol played its home matches at the 4,000-seat Fajardo Soccer Stadium in Fajardo.

In May 2019 Sol FC signed a contract with the city of Mayagüez to play its home matches at the Mayagüez Athletics Stadium. As part of the deal, Sol FC would have the right to exclusive use of the stadium through 2023. The stadium is owned by the city of Mayagüez and has a capacity of 12,175 with 5,100 of those being roofed seats. It was constructed to host the athletics and soccer games of the 2010 Central American and Caribbean Games.
