= Ryan López =

Puerto Rican footballer (born 1998)

Personal information
- Full name: Ryan Xavier López Viera
- Date of birth: 12 April 1998 (age 28)
- Place of birth: Humacao, Puerto Rico
- Height: 1.73 m (5 ft 8 in)
- Position: Midfielder

Team information
- Current team: Bayamón
- Number: 12

Youth career
- 2003–2005: Artesanos de Las Piedras
- 2005–2010: Tornados de Humacao
- 2010–2014: EFFE

College career
Years	Team	Apps	(Gls)
2016	Tigres de la Interamericana		(2+)

Senior career*
Years	Team	Apps	(Gls)
2014	Academia Quintana		
2015	Criollos de Caguas		(1+)
2016–2017	Bayamón		(6+)
2017–2018	Alalpardo	9	(2)
2019	Guaynabo Gol		(2+)
2019–2020	Bayamón	4+	(0+)
2021	Cleveland SC	4	(1)
2022–2024	Bayamón	10	(1)
2025	Caguas Sporting FC		
2025–	Puerto Rico Surf SC		

International career^{‡}
2013	Puerto Rico U15	5	(2)
2016	Puerto Rico U20	2	(0)
2019	Puerto Rico U23	1	(0)
2019	Puerto Rico	3	(0)
- * Club domestic league appearances and goals as of 3 July 2022 ‡ National team caps and goals as of 19 November 2019

Ryan Xavier López Viera (born 12 April 1998) is a Puerto Rican footballer who plays as a midfielder for Puerto Rican club Puerto Rico Surf SC and the Puerto Rico national team.

== Early life ==
López was born in Humacao, Puerto Rico, the son of Edwin López and Sandra Viera. He graduated from the Escuela Leoncio Meléndez y Florencia García in Las Piedras. López began playing football at the age of five with the club Artesanos de Las Piedras, then joined Tornados de Humacao when he was seven years old. After five years with Tornados, López moved to the Escuela de Formación de Futbolistas Española (EFFE) in Puerto Rico.

While at EFFE, López was part of two trips to Spain. While on those trips, he trained with the youth academies of Levante, Málaga, and Sevilla.

== Club career ==
=== 2014–2017: Early years in Puerto Rico ===
In 2014, at the age of 16, López made his senior debut with Academia Quintana. He helped Quintana to finish as runners-up in the Puerto Rico Soccer League (PRSL). At the end of the PRSL season, López went to Spain and went on a three-month trial with Guadalajara. His former coach at EFFE, Alberto Ruiz, was working as the youth director for the Segunda División B club.

After returning from his trial in Spain, López joined Criollos de Caguas. He scored a goal during Copa de la Excelencia II play against Leal Arecibo in May 2015.

López attended the Interamerican University of Puerto Rico, Metropolitan Campus during the 2016 season. He split the campaign between Tigres de la Interamericana, playing in the Liga Atlética Interuniversitaria de Puerto Rico, and Bayamón, in the PRSL. López wore the captain's armband for the Bayamón B team and scored four goals during the Clausura as Bayamón finished on top of the short season table.

In January 2017, López returned to Spain for a trial with Segunda División B club SS Reyes. His former coach Ruiz, speaking to FBNET, said that "Ryan will play in La Liga." After his trial ended on 12 April, López returned to Bayamón for a second season in the PRSL. He scored a goal against Mayagüez in May as part of a 10–0 victory.

=== 2017–2019: Move to Spain and return to the island ===
After helping Bayamón to the final of the Copa de la Excelencia III, López again returned to San Sebastián in August 2017. He played for Sanse in preseason, but the transfer was held up because of issues with his international transfer certificate (ITC). Due in part to Hurricanes Irma and Maria closing the offices of the Puerto Rican Football Federation, the ITC for López did not arrive for five months. He was finally made eligible in December and picked up with Alalpardo in the Segunda de Aficionados, the eighth tier of Spanish football. López scored two goals in nine appearances with Alalpardo.

Upon his return to Puerto Rico, López joined Guaynabo Gol for the remainder of the 2018–19 Liga Puerto Rico season. He scored two goals against Don Bosco in the first leg of the playoff quarterfinals.

López returned to Bayamón in 2019 for a second stint at the club, although now in the Liga Puerto Rico. Bayamón were leading the league when the 2019–20 season was prematurely canceled due to the COVID-19 pandemic in Puerto Rico. López next popped up in Mexico, where he was briefly part of Toros Bravos de Jalisco in the nascent MXUSSL, a league affiliated to the Sector Amateur del Fútbol Mexicano. However, the league had not yet played a game before López's departure.

=== 2019–present: Cleveland and third stint at Bayamón ===
In May 2021, López joined National Premier Soccer League club Cleveland SC for the 2021 season. He scored his lone goal while in Ohio on 4 June, tallying the first of a 6–0 victory against Pittsburgh Hotspurs. López played four times as Cleveland won the Rust Belt Conference in the regular season and the Midwest Region in the playoffs.

A third stint at Bayamón awaited López as he returned to Puerto Rico in 2022. He played 10 times in the league and scored a goal against his former club, Academia Quintana, in June. López starred during his continental debut, tallying three goals from four games as Bayamón finished as champions of the 2022 Caribbean Club Shield. He scored in both Group A games, with two goals in the opener against Junior Stars of Saint Martin and another two nights later against South East FC of Dominica. López started and played 102 minutes of the final as Bayamón defeated Inter Moengotapoe of Suriname in extra time.

== International career ==
López made his international debut for Puerto Rico at the under-15 level. He played in five matches at the 2013 CONCACAF Under-15 Championship, scoring two goals in a 6–0 victory against Saint Vincent and the Grenadines in Group D play. In November 2013, he scored for the under-17 national team in a game against a club team from the United States. However, López never played an official match at the U17 level.

López was called up for the first time at the under-23 level for 2015 CONCACAF Men's Olympic Qualifying Championship qualification. However, he did not play in either game as Puerto Rico finished on the bottom of Group 4.

For the under-20 national team, López was in the squad for 2017 CONCACAF U-20 Championship qualifying. He came off the bench against Cuba and started in the Group 1 finale against Antigua and Barbuda as Puerto Rico finished in third place in the group and were eliminated. Later that year, López was named to a preliminary squad as the senior team prepared for the third round of 2017 Caribbean Cup qualification, but he was not selected to the final roster.

In March 2019, López made it onto the bench for the senior team, but remained as an unused substitute during a defeat against Grenada in 2019–20 CONCACAF Nations League qualifying. Later that year, he represented the under-23s in 2020 CONCACAF Men's Olympic Qualifying Championship qualification. López played in the opening game of Group D play against Antigua and Barbuda.

=== Senior career, 2019–present ===
When he debuted in the Puerto Rico national team in autumn 2019, López was cited by El Vocero as being part of a "generational change" to the national team. After being named to the bench for a friendly against Honduras that September, he earned his first senior cap on 15 October against Anguilla. López played the entirety of a 3–2 victory as part of 2019–20 CONCACAF Nations League C play. He appeared twice more in Group C, a start against Guatemala and a substitute appearance in the return against Anguilla. However, López fell out of that youth movement and was not called up again under Elgy Morales.

== Career statistics ==
=== Club ===
As of 3 July 2022

Appearances and goals by club, season and competition
Club	Season	League			Cup (Note: Appearance(s) in the Copa Luis Villarejo)		Continental		Other		Total	
Club	Season	Division	Apps	Goals	Apps	Goals	Apps	Goals	Apps	Goals	Apps	Goals
Academia Quintana	2014	Puerto Rico Soccer League			—		—		—			
Criollos de Caguas	2015	Puerto Rico Soccer League		1+	—		—					1+
Bayamón	2016	Puerto Rico Soccer League		5+		1+	—		—			6+
Bayamón	2017	Puerto Rico Soccer League		1	—		—		0	0		1
Bayamón	Total			6+		1+	0	0	0	0		7+
Alalpardo	2017–18	Segunda de Aficionados	9	2	—		—		—		9	2
Guaynabo Gol	2018–19	Liga Puerto Rico		2+			—		—			2+
Bayamón	2019–20	Liga Puerto Rico	4+	0+	—		—		—		4+	0+
Cleveland SC	2021	NPSL	4	1	—		—		0	0	4	1
Bayamón	2022	Liga Puerto Rico	10	1	—		4 (Note: Appearances in the Caribbean Club Shield)	3	—		14	4
Bayamón	2022–23	Liga Puerto Rico	0	0	—		—		—		0	0
Bayamón	Total		10	1	0	0	4	3	0	0	14	4
Career total			27+	13+		1+	4	3			31+	17+

=== International ===
As of 19 November 2019

Appearances and goals by national team and year
National team	Year	Apps	Goals
Puerto Rico	2019	3	0
Total		3	0
