= Eric Reyes =

Eric Reyes may refer to:

- Eric Reyes (soccer), American-born, Puerto Rican soccer player
- Eric Reyes (basketball), Filipino basketball player
