= 2021 Liga Puerto Rico season =

Liga Puerto Rico
- Dates: September 25, 2021 - December 18th, 2021
- Champions: Bayamon FC
- Biggest home win: Metropolitan FA 14–0 Guaynabo Gol SC (6 November 2021)
- Biggest away win: Guaynabo Gol SC 0–7 Bayamon FC (17 October 2021)

The 2021 Liga Puerto Rico season was the second (full) season of the Liga Puerto Rico, the top tier soccer league on the island. Metropolitan FA were the reigning champions because of their 2018–19 Liga Puerto Rico championship in the inaugural season.

Bayamon FC were crowned champions.

== Standings ==
League Standings at the end of the season.

	Team	GP	W	D	L	GF	GA	GD	Pts.
1	Metropolitan FA	6	5	0	1	32	8	+	15
2	Puerto Rico Sol FC	6	5	0	1	19	9	+	15
3	Bayamon FC	6	4	0	2	23	11	+	12
4	Academia Quintana	6	2	2	2	19	14	+	8
5	CF Fraigcomar	6	2	1	3	15	9	+	7
6	Caguas Sporting FC	6	0	2	4	9	29	+	2
7	Guaynabo Gol SC	6	0	1	5	6	43	+	1

== Playoffs ==
=== Semi-Finals ===
December 11, 2021
16:30 EST (UTC−5)

Puerto Rico Sol FC	3–3 (a.e.t.)	Bayamon FC
15'; 76'; 82'		37'; 53'; 70'

Juan Cordero Dávila Stadium, San Juan
Referee: - (Puerto Rico)
December 12, 2021
19:30 EST (UTC−5)

Metropolitan FA	5–0	Academia Quintana
56'; 56'; 56'; 56'; 56'

Juan Cordero Dávila Stadium, San Juan
Referee: - (Puerto Rico)

=== Championship ===
December 18, 2021
16:30 EST (UTC−5)

Metropolitan FA	1–2 (a.e.t.)	Bayamon FC
Franco López 48'		Carlos Rosario 63'; Gerald Díaz 70'

Estadio CentroAmericano, Mayagüez
Referee: - (Puerto Rico)

LPR Champions
Bayamon FC
1st title
Livestream
