= Jason Pagan =

Cuban footballer (born 1994)

Personal information
- Date of birth: 20 April 1994 (age 32)
- Place of birth: Santiago de Cuba, Santiago, Cuba
- Height: 1.70 m (5 ft 7 in)
- Position: Midfielder

Team information
- Current team: Puerto Rico Bayamón
- Number: 22

Youth career
- 2011–2013: Chicago Fire Youth Academy

Senior career*
Years	Team	Apps	(Gls)
2013	Puerto Rico Islanders	20	(0)
2014–	Puerto Rico Bayamón	0	(0)
- * Club domestic league appearances and goals as of September 28, 2012

Jason Pagan (born 20 April 1994) is a Cuban soccer player who plays as a midfielder for the National Premier Soccer League club Puerto Rico Bayamón.

== Early life ==
After migrating to the United States from Cuba, Jason spent his youth career at various youth clubs around the city of Chicago. Many of which were indoor soccer as well as outdoor. He played for the Chicago fire youth academy.

== Career ==
=== Puerto Rico Islanders ===
In January 2013, Jason signed a contract with Puerto Rico Islanders for the 2013 spring and fall seasons.

=== Puerto Rico BFC ===
With the Puerto Rico Islanders being suspended from play, Jason signed with Bayamon FC. Jason is in contention to play with the Puerto Rican U-21 National squad. He will be playing with Bayamon FC in the upcoming season.
