= Kenroy Howell =

Jamaican footballer (born 1993)

Personal information
- Date of birth: 6 March 1993 (age 33)
- Place of birth: Manchester, Jamaica
- Height: 1.78 m (5 ft 10 in)
- Position: Forward

Team information
- Current team: A.D. Chalatenango

Youth career
- 2009–2013: Royal Lakes FC

Senior career*
Years	Team	Apps	(Gls)
2013–2016	Waterhouse		
2016	→ Dragón (loan)		
2017	Pittsburgh Riverhounds	14	(0)
2018-	Waterhouse	76	(29)
2021	A.D Chalatenango	8	(4)
- * Club domestic league appearances and goals as of 30 September 2017

Kenroy Howell (born 6 March 1993) is a Jamaican footballer who plays as a forward.

== Career ==
=== Youth ===
Howell was born in Manchester, Jamaica. He debuted for Royal Lakes FC of the St. Catherine Football Association in 2009 and remained with the club until 2013 when he transferred to Waterhouse F.C. of the Jamaica National Premier League. During the 2010 season, he was named the league most valuable player and most outstanding junior player as he scored 13 times and lead the team to the league title. He also played four years at Spanish Town High School, scoring 27 total goals.

=== Professional ===
Howell began his professional career with Waterhouse during the 2013-14 season after being brought up from the Under-21 team. He stayed with the club for three seasons, tallying 15 goals over that time. With the club he also competed in the 2014 CFU Club Championship, scoring two goals as the club topped its group. In July 2016, he was loaned to Salvadoran club C.D. Dragón for the remainder of the 2016 Salvadoran Primera División season. During his time with the club, he scored 1 goal in 16 league appearances, with his only goal coming against Isidro Metapán in October 2016. With Dragón, Howell also made four appearances in the group stage of the 2016–17 CONCACAF Champions League. He scored a goal against the Portland Timbers of Major League Soccer in the tournament in an eventual 1–2 defeat.

In December 2016, it was announced that Waterhouse FC transferred Howell to the Pittsburgh Riverhounds of the USL on a 1-year deal with a club option for an additional year. At the end of the season, the club did not pick up the option, and Howell departed Pittsburgh after just one year with the Riverhounds. In 2018, Howell returned to Waterhouse FC in Jamaica.
