= Club de Balompie Junqueño =

Association football club in Puerto Rico

- Full name: Club de Balompie Junqueño
- Founded: 2004; 22 years ago
- Ground: Parque de Fútbol Colegio Corazón de María; Juncos, Puerto Rico
- Capacity: 1,000
- Manager: Angel Bautista
- League: Liga Puerto Rico
- 2019/20: Abandoned
- Website: https://cbjunqueno.com/

Club de Balompie Junqueño is a Puerto Rican association football club from Juncos that currently plays in the Liga Puerto Rico.

== History ==
Club de Balompie Junqueño was founded in 2004. It joined the nascent Liga Puerto Rico for the 2019/20 season which was eventually cancelled because of the COVID-19 pandemic.

== Domestic history ==
Key

Champion Runners-up 3rd Place

Season	League							Domestic Cup	Notes
Season	Div.	Pos.	Pl.	W	D	L	P	Domestic Cup	Notes
2019–20	1st	N/A	16	2	1	13	7		Season abandoned because of COVID-19 pandemic

=== Year-by-year ===
Season	LPR Pro									Playoffs	CFU Club Championship	Top goalscorer		Managers
Season	Div.	Pos.	Pl.	W	D	L	GS	GA	P	Playoffs	CFU Club Championship	Name	League	Managers
2019-20	1st	12th	16	2	1	13	14	102	7	DNQ	Did not enter	(Puerto Rico)	-	(Puerto Rico)
2020-21	Season Cancelled due to COVID-19													
