= Romario Campbell =

Jamaican international footballer (born 1989)

Personal information
- Date of birth: 15 October 1989 (age 37)
- Position: Midfielder

Team information
- Current team: Mount Pleasant Football Academy

Senior career*
Years	Team	Apps	(Gls)
2009–2013	Harbour View	24	(1)
2013–2017	Waterhouse		
2017–2018	Humble Lions	11	(1)
2018–	Mount Pleasant Football Academy		

International career^{‡}
- Jamaica U17
- Jamaica U20
2010–	Jamaica	8	(0)
- * Club domestic league appearances and goals as of 8 June 2014 ‡ National team caps and goals as of 17 June 2015

Romario Campbell (born 15 October 1989) is a Jamaican international footballer who plays for Mount Pleasant Football Academy, as a midfielder.

== Career ==
=== Club ===
Campbell currently plays for Mount Pleasant Football Academy in the Red Stripe Premier League and has previously played for Humble Lions, Harbour View and Waterhouse.

=== International ===
He made his international debut for Jamaica in 2010.
