= Eric Reyes (soccer) =

American-born Puerto Rican footballer

Personal information
- Full name: Eric Emmanuel Reyes
- Date of birth: March 13, 1992 (age 34)
- Place of birth: Hollywood, Florida, United States
- Height: 6 ft 3 in (1.91 m)
- Position: Goalkeeper

Youth career
- 2006–2009: NSU University School

College career
Years	Team	Apps	(Gls)
2010	UC Santa Barbara Gauchos	3	(0)
2011–2012	FIU Panthers	14	(0)

Senior career*
Years	Team	Apps	(Gls)
2013	Bayamón Fútbol Club		

International career
2011–2014	Puerto Rico	11	(0)

Managerial career
- 2015–2016: Barry Buccaneers (goalkeepers)
- 2016–2017: Stetson Hatters (assistant)
- * Club domestic league appearances and goals

Eric Reyes (born March 13, 1992) is an American-born, Puerto Rican former soccer coach and player. He previously played as a professional goalkeeper and appeared for the Puerto Rico national football team.

== Playing career ==
=== Youth and college ===
Reyes has played college soccer for the UC Santa Barbara Gauchos and Florida International University. While a Gaucho in 2010, he appeared in and started 3 games.

=== Professional ===
Reyes had a trial with Iceland club ÍBV men's football in January 2013, but he was not signed. He signed with Bayamón Fútbol Club in April 2013 and played the 2013 Puerto Rico Soccer League season for the club before being released at the conclusion of the season.

=== International ===
Reyes made his international debut for the Puerto Rico national football team on September 6, 2011, against Canada at the age of 19 years. He appeared 11 times for Puerto Rico, the last coming in 2014 Caribbean Cup qualification.

== Coaching career ==
Following his playing career, Reyes joined the coaching staff of the Barry Buccaneers. He joined the men's and women's teams as goalkeeper coach in Spring 2015. He spent 18 months at the university.

In July 2016, it was announced that Reyes had joined the Stetson Hatters women's team as an assistant coach. He was listed as a member of the coaching staff through the 2017 season.

== Personal life ==
Following his soccer career, Reyes joined the Broward County Sheriff's Office as a deputy in February 2019.
