= Miguel Rivera =

Miguel Rivera may refer to:

- Miguel Rivera (jockey) (born 1943), Puerto Rican jockey
- Miguel Rivera (football manager) (born 1961), Spanish football manager
- Miguel Rivera (serial killer) (fl. 1972-1973), also known as Charlie Chop-off, unidentified American serial killer
- Miguel Rivera (volleyball) (born 1984), Spanish volleyball coach

== See also ==
- Miguel Primo de Rivera (1870-1930), Spanish dictator and military officer
