= Alejandro Rabell =

Puerto Rican footballer

Personal information
- Full name: Alejandro Javier Rabell
- Date of birth: November 12, 2001 (age 24)
- Place of birth: San Juan, Puerto Rico
- Height: 1.72 m (5 ft 7 1/2 in)
- Position: Midfielder

Team information
- Current team: NJIT Highlanders
- Number: 13

College career
Years	Team	Apps	(Gls)
2019–2023	NJIT Highlanders	13	(6)
2023–	St. John's Red Storm men's soccer		

Senior career*
Years	Team	Apps	(Gls)
2016–2019	Bayamón FC		(19)

International career^{‡}
2016	Puerto Rico U17	3	(0)
2018–	Puerto Rico U20	7	(4)
2018–	Puerto Rico	2	(0)
- * Club domestic league appearances and goals as of January, 2019 ‡ National team caps and goals as of January, 2019

Alejandro Javier Rabell (born November 12, 2001) is a Puerto Rican international footballer who currently plays for St. John's Red Storm in the NCAA D1 and the Puerto Rico national football team.

== Career ==
Rabell has played club soccer in Puerto Rico and also in the United States and Spain. He has played for The Baldwin School of Puerto Rico where he also studied. He also played for Lonestar SC of the U.S. Soccer Development Academy before moving to Barcelona where he played for Marcet where he faced teams such as Sevilla FC and Mallorca.

He made his senior debut with Bayamón FC in 2016, but played full time in the 2018-19 season where he managed to score 19 goals in the Liga Puerto Rico and 4 in the Copa Luis Villarejo for a total of 23 goals.

He joined NCAA D1 side NJIT Highlanders where he scored a goal and assisted on his debut.

== International ==
In 2016 Rabell was called up to the Puerto Rico U17 national team where he earned 3 caps playing the first round of the World Cup Qualifiers. In 2018, Rabell trained with both Senior and U20 national teams. He played 5 games with Puerto Rico U20 at the 2018 Concacaf Championship at IMG Academy where he also scored 3 goals.

On November 16, 2018, Rabell made his debut with the Puerto Rico national football team where he started in the match against Belize in the CONCACAF Nations League qualifying.

In February 2020, he was called up for his second time with the Puerto Rico U-20 national football team for the first round of World Cup Qualification.
