= Parc Bayas =

Haitian sports complex

Parc Bayas is a sports complex located at Mirebalais, Haiti. It was inaugurated in March 2014, and it includes a football field which can accommodate approximately 3,000 spectators.
