= Mirabelli SA =

Association football club in Puerto Rico

- Full name: Mirabelli Soccer Academy
- Founded: 2010; 16 years ago
- Ground: Parque de Fútbol Colegio Corazón de María; Juncos, Puerto Rico
- Capacity: 1,000
- Manager: Edwin Montes
- League: Liga Puerto Rico
- 2019/20: Abandoned
- Website: https://www.facebook.com/MSA.Futbol

Mirabelli SA is a Puerto Rican association football club from Carolina that currently plays in the Liga Puerto Rico.

== History ==
Mirabelli SA joined the nascent Liga Puerto Rico for its inaugural season in 2019/20. It went on to finish in seventh place of eight teams. The club began the 2019/20 campaign which was eventually abandoned because of the COVID-19 pandemic.

== Domestic history ==
Key

Champion Runners-up 3rd Place

Season	League							Domestic Cup	Notes
Season	Div.	Pos.	Pl.	W	D	L	P	Domestic Cup	Notes
2018/19	1st	7	21	5	0	16	15	Quarterfinals	
2019/20	1st	N/A	16	5	3	8	18		Season abandoned because of COVID-19 pandemic

=== Year-by-year ===
Season	LPR Pro									Playoffs	CFU Club Championship	Top goalscorer		Managers
Season	Div.	Pos.	Pl.	W	D	L	GS	GA	P	Playoffs	CFU Club Championship	Name	League	Managers
2018-19	1st	7th	21	5	0	16	31	59	15	DNQ	Did not enter	(Puerto Rico)	-	(Puerto Rico)
2019-20	1st	9th	16	5	3	8	21	33	18	Cancelled	Did not enter	(Puerto Rico)	-	(Puerto Rico)
2020-21	Season Cancelled due to COVID-19													(Puerto Rico)
