= Josep Ferré =

Spanish football manager (born 1983)

Personal information
- Full name: Josep María Ferré Ybarz
- Date of birth: 26 November 1983 (age 42)
- Place of birth: Barcelona, Spain

Managerial career
- Years: Team
- 2013–2014: Buriram United (academy manager)
- 2015: Ratchaburi Mltr Phol
- 2016–2017: Bangkok Glass (assistant)
- 2018: Bangkok Glass
- 2018: Bayamón
- 2019–2020: East Bengal (assistant)
- 2022: Ascó
- 2022–2023: Philippines
- 2023–2024: Persis Solo (assistant)
- 2024–2025: Philippines U20
- 2025–: Johor Darul Ta'zim II

Josep María Ferré Ybarz (born 26 November 1983), commonly known as Coco, is a Spanish football manager. He is currently head coach of Malaysia A1 Semi-Pro League club Johor Darul Ta'zim II.

== Managerial career ==
Ferré began his coaching career in the academy of CE Europa. Subsequently, he worked in the academy of CE Premià before working in FC Barcelona Escola.

=== Buriram United ===
After working with FCB Escola, he went to Thailand where he worked as academy director in Buriram United where he also coached the "B" team.

=== Ratchaburi Mitr Phol ===
In 2015, Ferré coached Ratchaburi Mitr Phol. He led the team to a seventh-place finish, failing to secure a spot in the 2016 AFC Champions League Qualifying play-off. At the end of the season, his contract was not renewed.

=== Bangkok Glass ===
In 2016, Ferré was appointed as the assistant coach of Aurelio Vidmar in Bangkok Glass. Following the departure of Vidmar in the mid-season, he remained as the assistant coach of Surachai Jaturapattarapong, who took over as the interim head coach. Ferré was appointed as head coach for the following season. In 2018, he was sacked by the club as a result of Bangkok's dismal run of results, which included only seven points in seven games.

=== Bayamón ===
In September 2018, he was appointed as head coach in Bayamón which plays at Liga Puerto Rico.

=== East Bengal ===
In 2019, he has been appointed as an assistant coach and video analyst of Alejandro Menéndez in East Bengal which plays in I-League. On 21 January 2020, he left the club.

=== Ascó ===
In May 2022, it was announced that Ferré was appointed as the head coach of Catalan club, FC Ascó. In November 2022, the club and Ferré himself have mutually agreed for his departure.

=== Philippines ===
On 8 December 2022, the Philippines national football team, more commonly known as the Azkals, announced Ferré as its new head coach. Having appointed on short notice, Ferre failed to lead the Philippines to the semifinals of the 2022 AFF Championship. Prior to that campaign, his team yielded a 0–1 lose to a friendly against Vietnam.

==== Return to the Philippines ====
In April 2024, it was announced that Ferré was appointed as the new technical director of the Philippine Football Federation.

In July 2024, the PFF announced that Ferré would be the head coach for the Philippines U19 team in the upcoming ASEAN U-19 Boys Championship in Surabaya, Indonesia.

=== Johor Darul Ta'zim II ===
In July 2025, Ferré was appointed as the coach of the Johor Darul Ta'zim II team to compete in the 2025–26 Malaysia A1 Semi-Pro League.

== Managerial statistics ==
As of match played 24 May 2026

Managerial record by team and tenure
Team	Nat.	From	To	Record					Ref.
Team	Nat.	From	To	G	W	D	L	Win %	Ref.
Ratchaburi Mltr Phol	(Thailand)	29 January 2015	30 November 2015	42	22	4	16	52.38	
Bangkok Glass	(Thailand)	27 November 2017	29 March 2018	7	2	1	4	28.57	
Bayamón	(Puerto Rico)	1 September 2018	12 June 2019	29	20	5	4	68.97	
Ascó	(Spain)	1 July 2022	25 November 2022	8	0	2	6	0.00	
Philippines	(Philippines)	1 December 2022	31 January 2023	5	1	0	4	20.00	
Philippines U20	(Philippines)	1 June 2024	1 June 2025	6	2	0	4	33.33	
Johor Darul Ta'zim II	(Malaysia)	29 July 2025	Present	30	21	6	3	70.00	
Career Total				127	68	18	41	53.54	
