= Jorge Rosa =

Puerto Rican footballer

Personal information
- Full name: Jorge Rosa Menéndez
- Date of birth: September 3, 1997 (age 29)
- Place of birth: San Juan, Puerto Rico
- Height: 1.70 m (5 ft 7 in)
- Position: Midfielder

Team information
- Current team: San Juan FC
- Number: 10

College career
Years	Team	Apps	(Gls)
2015	Dominican College		
2018–	UPR-Bayamón		

Senior career*
Years	Team	Apps	(Gls)
2014	Schulz Academy		
?–?	CF Fraigcomar		
2016–?	Puerto Rico Bayamón		
2026–	San Juan FC		

International career^{‡}
2012	Puerto Rico U17	3	(0)
2017–	Puerto Rico	1	(0)
- * Club domestic league appearances and goals ‡ National team caps and goals as of June 13, 2017

Jorge Rosa (born September 3, 1997) is a Puerto Rican footballer who plays as a midfielder for Puerto Rican club San Juan FC.

== Career ==
Rosa played most of his young career in Puerto Rico before moving to the United States where he played at Schulz Academy. He joined Bayamón FC in 2016.

In the middle of August 2026, it was announced he had joined San Juan FC for the 2026–27 Liga Puerto Rico Pro season.

== International career ==
He was called up for the Puerto Rico national under-17 football team in 2012 where he got 3 caps in the first round of the FIFA World Cup qualification. In 2016 he made his debut with the Puerto Rico national football team in a friendly match against Indonesia.
