= Juan Vélez (footballer) =

Puerto Rican footballer

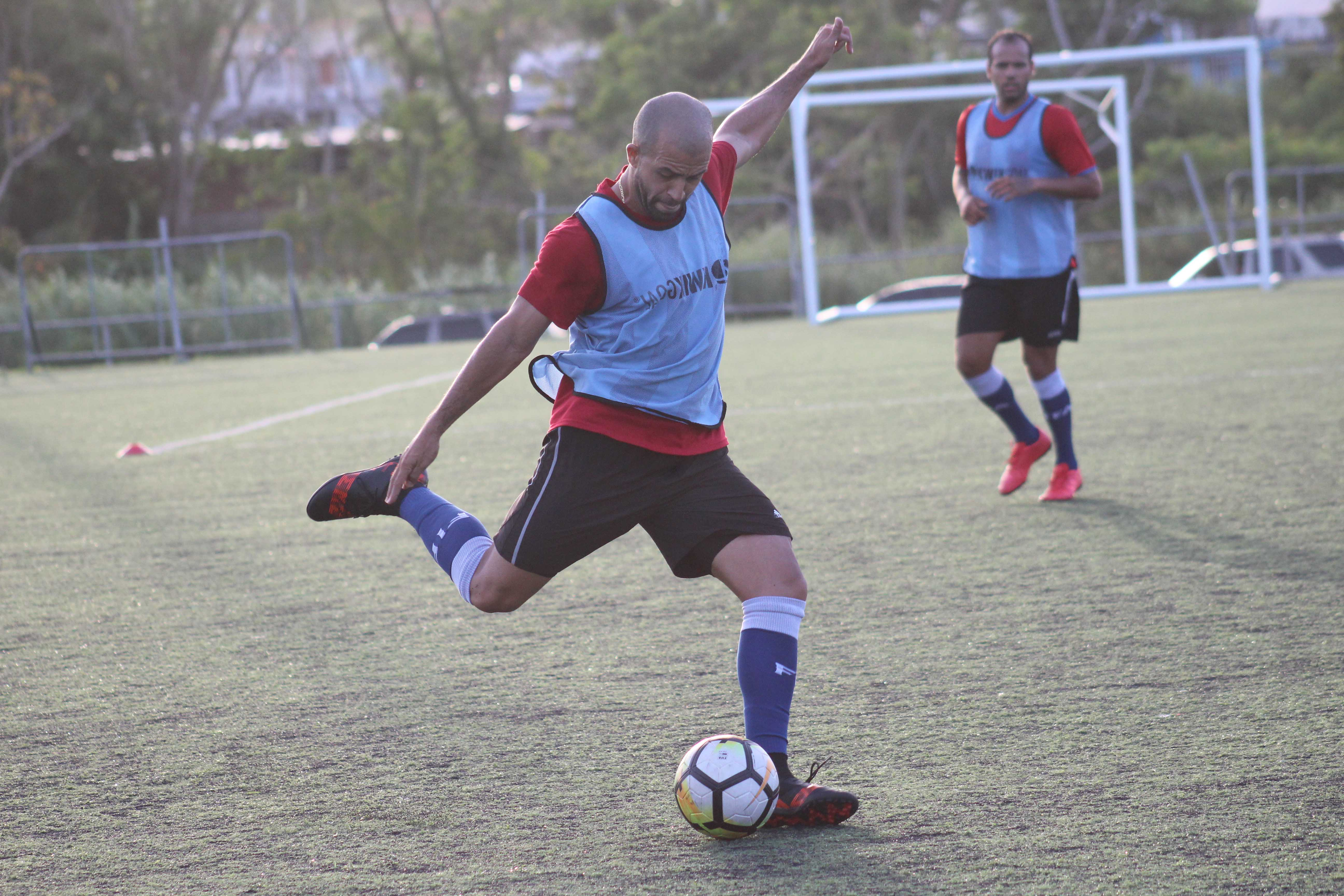

Personal information
- Full name: Juan G. Vélez Lago
- Date of birth: December 5, 1989 (age 36)
- Place of birth: San Juan, Puerto Rico
- Height: 1.77 m (5 ft 10 in)
- Position: Center-back

Team information
- Current team: GPS Puerto Rico

Senior career*
| Years | Team | Apps | (Gls) |
| 2010 | Sevilla FC Puerto Rico | | |
| 2011–2014 | Puerto Rico Bayamón | | |
| 2015–2016 | Criollos de Caguas FC | | |
| 2017- | Bauger FC | | |
| 2018 | GPS Puerto Rico | | |

International career
| 2013 | Puerto Rico Beach | | |
| 2014– | Puerto Rico | 11 | (0) |
- * Club domestic league appearances and goals

Juan Vélez (born 5 December 1989 in San Juan, Puerto Rico) is a Puerto Rican footballer who plays for GPS Puerto Rico.

== Career ==
Leaving Puerto Rican side Criollos FC to line up for Bauger FC in the third edition of the Dominican Professional Football League, Velez expressed excitement at the opportunity to go abroad for the first time. Bauger technical director Jorge Allen Bauger claimed that they signed the defender to strengthen the defensive line, also struck by his cognizance about Caribbean football on general (including the Dominican Republic) and his experience in the international stage. Suffering a fractured ACL on the left side in the last international match he started, a 0-0 draw with Indonesia, Velez was sent to recover after surgery for around six months before possibly returning to play, missing Bauger's last seven games of the season in the process. He returned to Puerto Rico and played for GPS Puerto Rico in the FPF Preparatory Tournament.

== International ==
From early age, Vélez was involved with the national teams. In 2007, he played with an under-17 national team that had the vision of playing in the 2010 Central American and Caribbean Games, and Vélez scored a goal with the team against Chivas USA in a friendly match. He was called up to the Puerto Rico under-21 team set to participate in the 2010 Central American and Caribbean Games but the tournament was canceled. In 2013, he played on the first Puerto Rico national beach soccer team in the World Cup Qualifiers. In 2014, he made his official debut with the senior national team for the Caribbean Cup.

== Personal life ==
His brother Elliot Vélez also played for the Puerto Rico national football team.
