= Fajardo Soccer Stadium =

Football stadium in Fajardo, Puerto Rico

- Interactive map of Fajardo Soccer Stadium
- Location: Calle Coliseo; Fajardo, Puerto Rico
- Coordinates: 18.325787°N 65.652382°W
- Capacity: 4,000 (1,792 seated)
- Surface: Grass

Tenant
- Puerto Rico Sol FC (2019–present)

The Fajardo Soccer Stadium is a 4,000-seat association football stadium in Fajardo, Puerto Rico. As of the 2018-19 Liga Puerto Rico season, it hosts the home matches of Puerto Rico Sol FC.
