= Parque de Fútbol Colegio Corazón de María =

- Interactive map of Parque de Fútbol Colegio Corazón de María
- Location: Juncos, Puerto Rico
- Coordinates: 18.2275°N 65.9051°W
- Capacity: 1,000
- Surface: Grass

Tenant
- Club de Balompie Junqueño

The Parque de Fútbol Colegio Corazón de María is a 1,000-seat association football stadium in Juncos, Puerto Rico. As of the 2019-20 Liga Puerto Rico season, it hosts the home matches of Club de Balompie Junqueño .
