= Luis Cosme =

Puerto Rican footballer

Personal information
- Full name: Luis Cosme
- Date of birth: 21 December 2000 (age 25)
- Place of birth: Puerto Rico
- Position: Left back

Team information
- Current team: Bayamón
- Number: 6

Youth career
- Bayamón

Senior career*
Years	Team	Apps	(Gls)
2018–	Bayamón		

International career^{‡}
2018–	Puerto Rico	4	(0)
- * Club domestic league appearances and goals as of 6 February 2019 ‡ National team caps and goals as of 6 February 2019

Luis Cosme (born 21 December 2000), is a Puerto Rican international footballer who plays as a left back for Bayamón.
