= Emmanuel D'Andrea =

Puerto Rican footballer (born 1995)

Personal information
- Full name: Emmanuel Alejandro D'Andrea Yépez
- Date of birth: January 20, 1995 (age 31)
- Place of birth: Caracas, Venezuela
- Height: 1.80 m (5 ft 11 in)
- Positions: Central defender; defensive midfielder; attacking midfielder

Team information
- Current team: Bayamón FC

Youth career
- 2013–2014: Sevilla

College career
Years	Team	Apps	(Gls)
2012–2013	Georgia Perimeter College		

Senior career*
Years	Team	Apps	(Gls)
2014–2016	Sevilla C	7	(0)
2016–2017	Manlleu	23	(1)
2017–2018	Atlético Onubense	11	(0)
2019–	Bayamón FC	3	(0)

International career^{‡}
2007	Puerto Rico U15		
2012–2013	Puerto Rico U20	8	(0)
2012–2019	Puerto Rico	17	(1)
- * Club domestic league appearances and goals as of July 29, 2016 ‡ National team caps and goals as of June 13, 2017

Emmanuel Alejandro D'Andrea Yépez (born January 20, 1995) is a professional footballer who plays as a defender for Puerto Rican club Bayamón FC and the Puerto Rican national team.

D'Andrea was born to Venezuelan parents in Caracas, Venezuela. He is of Italian descent through his paternal side. He was living in Puerto Rico since he was a year and a half old. He became an American citizen of Puerto Rico at age 10. Since then, he has triple nationality: Venezuelan, Italian and Puerto Rican.

== Club career ==
D'Andrea played college soccer for Georgia Perimeter College. In 2013, D'Andrea joined the youth ranks of Sevilla FC.

== International career ==
After playing for the Puerto Rico under-20 team, he made his senior international debut for Puerto Rico in 2012.
