= Eloy Matos =

Puerto Rican footballer

Personal information
- Date of birth: 10 April 1985 (age 41)
- Place of birth: San Juan, Puerto Rico
- Position: Striker

Team information
- Current team: Don Bosco FC
- Number: 13

Youth career
- 2004–2008: Western Nebraska Community College

Senior career*
| Years | Team | Apps | (Gls) |
| 2008–2009 | Atletico de San Juan FC | 23 | (9) |
| 2010 | Puerto Rico Bayamón | 2 | (2) |
| 2011 | River Plate Puerto Rico | 4 | (1) |
| 2012– | Puerto Rico Bayamón | 0 | (0) |

International career
| 2008–2014 | Puerto Rico | 3 | (0) |
- * Club domestic league appearances and goals as of 9 July 2008

Eloy Matos is a Puerto Rican soccer player who plays for Don Bosco FC.
