= Andrés Cabrero =

Puerto Rican footballer (born 1989)

Personal information
- Full name: Andrés Nicolas Cabrero Gomez
- Date of birth: 4 January 1989 (age 37)
- Place of birth: San Juan, Puerto Rico
- Height: 1.83 m (6 ft 0 in)
- Position: Midfielder

Team information
- Current team: DS Edusoccer
- Number: 17

College career
Years	Team	Apps	(Gls)
2007	Georgia Southern Eagles		

Senior career*
Years	Team	Apps	(Gls)
2007–2008	Puerto Rico Islanders	6	(0)
2008	Sevilla FC Puerto Rico (loan)	2	(0)
2009	Puerto Rico Islanders	10	(0)
2009–2010	FK Teleoptik	2	(0)
2010	River Plate Puerto Rico	8	(1)
2011	Puerto Rico United	5	(0)
2012–2013	Sevilla Bayamón		
2013–2014	North East Stars		
2014–2015	Criollos de Caguas		
2015–2017	Kultsu	67	(1)
2018	GPS Puerto Rico	11	(1)
2018–2024	Bayamón FC		(10)
2021–2022	Metropolitan (loan)		
2024	Academia Quintana		
2025	FC Mayagüez		
2026	Ponce FC		

International career^{‡}
2008	Puerto Rico U-20	3	(0)
2008–2018	Puerto Rico	39	(5)

Managerial career
- 2026–: DS Edusoccer (assistant)
- * Club domestic league appearances and goals as of 21:52, 26 June 2018 (UTC) ‡ National team caps and goals as of 21:52, 26 June 2018 (UTC)

Andrés Cabrero (born 4 January 1989) is a retired Puerto Rican international footballer, now football coach who is currently the assistant coach for DS Edusoccer.

== Career ==
In 2008 Cabrero made his international debut for Puerto Rico. and at age 19 represented Puerto Rico for the World Cup Qualifiers as a starting midfielder in all games. After outstanding games against Bermudas, Dominican Republic (overtime assist to Peter Villegas for the win), and World Cup Qualifiers Honduras (assist to Peter Villegas for PR's advantage 2–1) and Trinidad Tobago, he turned professional with the Puerto Rico Islanders gaining experience in local and international club competitions. He was transferred to Sevilla FC of the Puerto Rico Soccer League on a short-term loan and returned to the Islanders for the conclusion of the 2008 and for the 2009 season. He was afterwards recruited and trained by Serbia's FK Teleoptik (Partizan FK second division team). and at the end of his contract returned to Puerto Rico to participate in the 2010 Central American and Caribbean Games.

During 2011 Cabrero excelled as a midfielder for Mayaguez FC of the Puerto Rico professional league and for Bayamón FC, Champions of the Puerto Rico National League. Once again, at age 22, he excelled in the Puerto Rico National Team 2014 World Cup Qualifiers against Canada, St. Kitts and St. Lucia and was awarded by the Puerto Rico Football Federation the recognition of Puerto Rico's 2011 Most Outstanding Player. After an undefeated season with Bayamon FC he was invited for training at Sevilla FC (Spain) where he obtained positive evaluations from the club and recognitions from the local sport press. He was referred by Sevilla FC for further evaluation to Ecija Balompie where he was offered a contract at Spain's 2B division. For personal reasons Cabrero returned to Puerto Rico. During his next years at Bayamon FC, Puerto Rico, Cabrero once again helped the team achieve two additional consecutive undefeated seasons at the island's highest level of competition. Afterwards in 2013, he moved to Criollos FC and played in Trinidad Tobago's First Division with the North East Stars. In 2014 returned to Criollos as a franchise player and helped the team achieve three consecutive undefeated tournaments. In April 2015, After excelling in an international friendly against Canada, he decided to accept an invitation for try-outs at Kultsu FC, Finland, signed a contract occupying one of the three positions for foreigners mainly as a defensive midfielder. He helped the team arise from a descending position to a division title contender and finalist. After the end of the Finnish season, Cabrero returned to Puerto Rico and joined the Criollos de Caguas helping the team gain the title of the Puerto Rico's National League First Division Champions.

Knowledge of the game, technicality, vision, passing ability, creativity and versatility are some of his main characteristics. As a PR National Team player Cabrero has started, according to need and strategy, mainly in the center of the court as central midfielder, attacking midfielder and defensive midfielder. He has also played as left and right midfielder and as a forward. Upon the loss of two central defenders in a crucial stage of the Finnish championship, Cabrero was trusted to assumed the responsibility during the 5 games crisis. As a midfielder Cabrero scored 5 goals with the Puerto Rico National Football team, scoring vsBermuda, El Salvador, St. Kitts & Nevis, Nicaragua and St. Lucia.

During his early years Cabrero played for Conquistadores de Guaynabo, Puerto Rico. Afterwards, he played for Cobb FC at Atlanta, Georgia. He was a member of the Georgia Olympic Development Program squad from 2004 to 2006 and a member of the United States Olympic Development Program, Region III Team, in 2005 and 2006.

Cabrero is known for his teamwork and assists. On 27 April 2015, Cabrero signed for Finnish side Kultsu. He also played for Kultsu during the 2016 season and was named and acted as Captain for the Finnish team.

== International ==
Cabrero made his debut with Puerto Rico national team in January 2008, and was the most experienced player on the team with the most caps (39). He also played with the under-20 team in July 2008 for World Cup Qualifiers.

=== International Goals ===
No.	Date	Venue	Opponent	Score	Result	Competition	Ref.
1.	18 January 2008	Juan Ramón Loubriel Stadium, Bayamón, Puerto Rico	Bahamas	1–0		Friendly	
2.	7 October 2011	Juan Ramón Loubriel Stadium, Bayamón, Puerto Rico	Saint Kitts and Nevis	1–0	1–1	2014 FIFA World Cup qualification	
3.	11 November 2011	Juan Ramón Loubriel Stadium, Bayamón, Puerto Rico	Saint Lucia	4–0	4–0	2014 FIFA World Cup qualification	
4.	22 February 2012	Estadio Cuscatlán, San Salvador, El Salvador	El Salvador	1–2	1–2	Friendly	
5.	1 June 2012	Bayamon Soccer Complex, Bayamon, Puerto Rico	Nicaragua	2–1	3–1	Friendly	
