= Bayamón Soccer Complex =

Sports venue in Bayamón, Puerto Rico

Bayamon Soccer Complex
- Parque de Fútbol Honda "Honda Football Park"
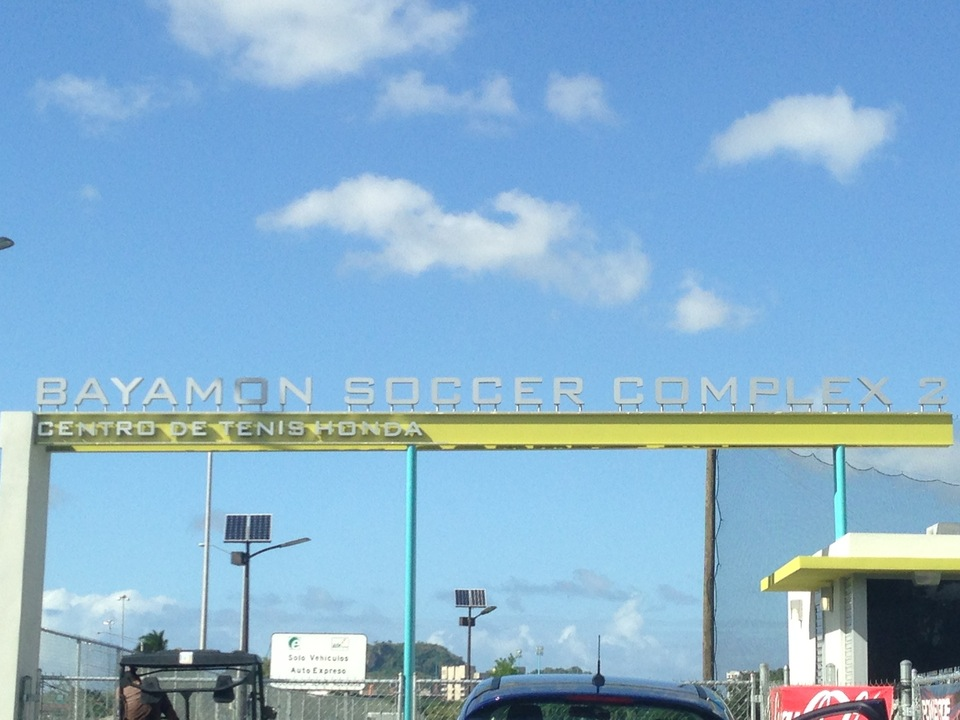
- Interactive map of Bayamon Soccer Complex
- Address: Calle Quintana; Route 5, intersection with Route 199
- Location: Bayamón, Puerto Rico
- Coordinates: 18.3662921°N 66.1664378°W
- Owner: Municipio de Bayamón
- Operator: Bayamón FC
- Capacity: 1,000 (Field 1); 250 (Field 2); 750 (Field 3)
- Surface: Artificial turf (Field 1); Grass (Field 2 & 3)

Construction
- Opened: February 12, 2011
- Cost: $6 miilion

Tenants
- Current: Bayamón Futbol Club (LPR) (2011–); Former

The Bayamon Soccer Complex is a complex of 2 soccer fields and one 1,000-capacity stadium located in Bayamon, Puerto Rico that is host to several teams of the San Juan–Caguas–Guaynabo metropolitan area. Youth, middle school, high school, and adult recreational soccer is held at the complex. Field 1 is home to Bayamón FC, a member of the Liga Puerto Rico.

== Fields ==
=== Bayamon Soccer Complex I ===
Fields 1 & 2 is centrally located serving multiple neighborhoods in the city of Bayamon; being Minillas, Tio, Reparto Zarina, and Vista Bella. Being a couple miles to the south of Bayamon Soccer Complex 2. The field 1 is a professional sized soccer field and field 2 is a recreational sized soccer field with a small youth sized field for youth teams attached to the west.

=== Bayamon Soccer Complex II ===
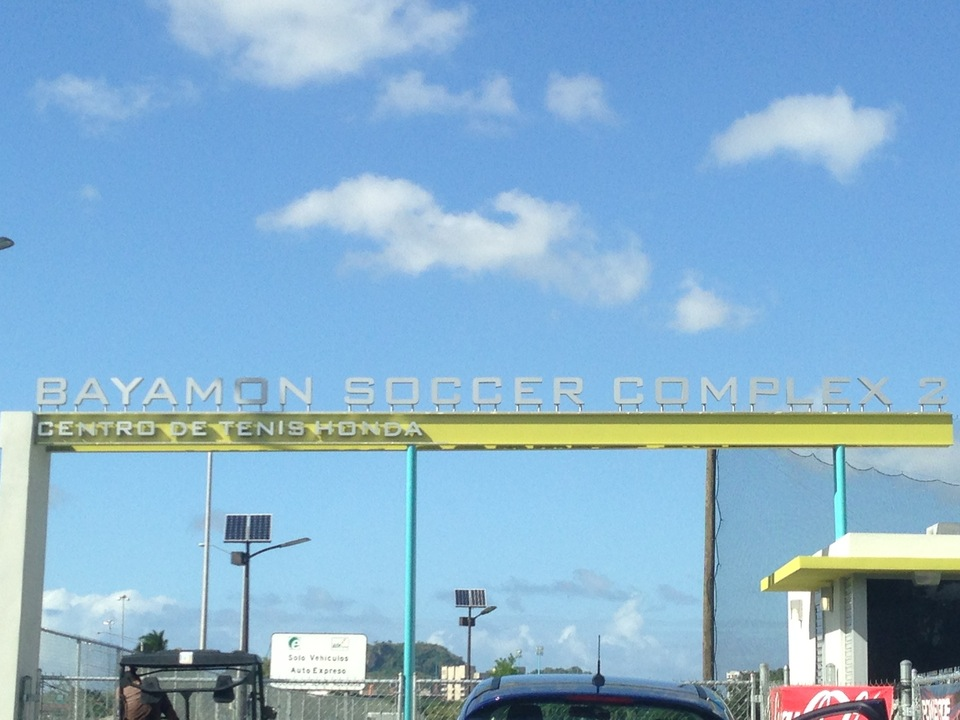
Bayamon Soccer Complex II or known as Parque de Futbol Honda.

Field 3 is also known by Parque de Futbol Honda by the community or Honda Soccer Park in English it is located in the Rio Hondo neighborhood of Bayamon. The field is a professional sized soccer field with a small youth sized field for youth teams attached to the west and tennis courts to the east.

On March 9, 2016, Meredith College and SUNY Oneonta as an NCAA Division II women's lacrosse match-up. SUNY won the game 17–13.
