= Puerto Rican Football Federation =

Governing body of association football in Puerto Rico

CONCACAF
- Founded: 1940
- Headquarters: San Juan
- FIFA affiliation: 1960
- CONCACAF affiliation: 1964
- President: Iván Rivera
- Website: fedefutbolpr.com

The Puerto Rican Football Federation (Spanish: Federación Puertorriqueña de Fútbol) is the governing body of association football in Puerto Rico. It was founded in 1940 and became affiliated to FIFA in 1960, one of the last to do so in the Western Hemisphere. It governs all football on the island, including the Puerto Rico national football team, the Liga Puerto Rico Pro and other regional competitions.

== History ==
Due to being a territory of the United States, the governance of football on Puerto Rico has been different from its neighbors. In recent years, the federation has tried to improve the island's inadequate history in the sport.

On May 14, 2008, the federation announced the creation of the Puerto Rico Soccer League, the first unified league in the history of the island's football, although it folded in 2011. In recent years the Federation has attempted to overhaul the island's historic underperformance in football, which has been helped by the co-operation from a number of established club teams from around the world, who are keen to build up a base in Puerto Rico.

On March 9, 2015, the federation's executive committee approved a resolution specifying that in Puerto Rico there will be only one division league. Before then, the FPF statutes had allowed for more than one first division league.

In 2019, Iván Rivera was appointed president of the federation.

In 2024, the federation introduced the current logo.

=== Crest history ===
Crest used from 2013 to 2024.

Current Crest used since 2024.

== National teams ==
=== Puerto Rico men's national football team ===
The Puerto Rico men's national team played their first international match in 1940 against Cuba. Héctor Pito Ramos is the team's all time goalscorer and cap leader, having last played in 2019. As of 2026, Puerto Rico has never qualified for a FIFA World Cup or a CONCACAF Gold Cup.

The team won their group in the 2022–23 CONCACAF Nations League C. As a result, the team was promoted to the Nations League B the following year; they also earned a place in the 2023 Gold Cup qualifiers, but failed to qualify for the Gold Cup.

=== Youth national teams ===
The federation oversees and promotes the development of a few youth national teams:

- P.R. under-20 men
- P.R. under-17 men
- P.R. under-15 men
- P.R. under-20 women
- P.R. under-17 women

== Professional leagues ==
Despite a very short history of professional football on the island, Puerto Rico has struggled to build and sustain a domestic football league. They have gone through many different iterations, finally landing on the Liga Puerto Rico Pro that was founded in 2018.

=== Men ===
The Liga Puerto Rico Pro is the top division of football on the island of Puerto Rico. Its teams range widely in financial status with some able to pay semi-pro wages and others made up entirely of amateurs. The winner of the league has earned a berth in the following CFU Club Championship until the tournament was replaced by the CONCACAF Caribbean Cup in 2023. For the 2024-25 season, the league introduced the Supercopa to decide the berth for the CFU Club Shield with the winners of both the apertura and clausura seasons facing off.

=== Women ===
The Superior Femenino de la Liga Puerto Rico is the top division of football on the island of Puerto Rico.

=== Past leagues ===
This is a list of leagues previously organized by FPF.

- Campeonato Nacional de Fútbol de Puerto Rico (2005-2007)
- Liga Nacional de Fútbol de Puerto Rico - LNF (2009-2016)
- Liga Puerto Rico Pro - LPR PRO (2018-present)

==== League history ====
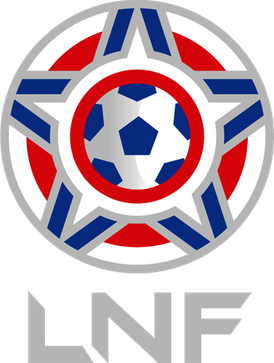
Logo of Liga Nacional de Fútbol de Puerto Rico

Logo of Liga Puerto Rico

Logo of Liga Puerto Rico Pro

=== Youth leagues ===
- Liga Juvenil Puerto Rico
Logo of the Puerto Rican youth soccer league.

== Organization ==
=== Members ===
FPF recognizes the following members:

==== Professional council ====
- Liga Puerto Rico Pro (LPR PRO)
- Superior Femenino de la Liga Puerto Rico (LFPR)
- Liga Futbol Playa (LFP)
- Puerto Rico International Futsal Championship

== Current staff and past presidents ==
Name	Position	Source
(Puerto Rico) Ivan E. Rivera Gutierrez	President	
(Puerto Rico) Antonio Lopez	Vice President	
(Puerto Rico) Jose Martinez	2nd Vice President	
(Puerto Rico) Gabriel Ortiz	General Secretary	
(Puerto Rico) Raul Rivera	Treasurer	
(Cuba) Luis Mozo	Technical Director	
(Argentina) Víctor Nicolás Lonchuk	Team Coach (Men's)	
(Puerto Rico) Nat González	Team Coach (Women's)	
Unknown.	Media/Communications Manager	
(Puerto Rico) Santiago Francisco	Chairperson of the Referees Committee	
(Puerto Rico) Fabian Arce	Futsal Coordinator	
(Puerto Rico) Jesus Lebron	Referee Coordinator	

Past presidents

1. Paco Bueso
2. José Laureano Cantero
3. Cristo Manuel Romero Sánchez (1968–1969)
4. José M. Arsuaga
5. Dr. Roberto Monroig
6. Esteban Rodríguez Estrella (1982–1984)
7. Luis Russi Dilán (1994–2002)
8. Joe Serralta (2004–2010)
9. Eric Labrador (2011–2019)
10. Iván Rivera (2019–present)

== See also ==
- Puerto Rican football league system
- Association football in Puerto Rico
- Puerto Rico Islanders
- Liga Nacional de Fútbol de Puerto Rico
- Liga Puerto Rico Pro
- Puerto Rico Capitals
