= Guaynabo Gol SC =

Association football club in Puerto Rico

- Full name: Guaynabo Gol Soccer Club
- Founded: 2007; 19 years ago
- Dissolved: 2023
- Ground: Estadio Charlie Fuentes; Guaynabo, Puerto Rico
- Capacity: 1,000
- Manager: Jose Lubary
- League: Liga Puerto Rico
- 2023 Apertura: Regular Season: 7th
- Website: https://www.facebook.com/guaynabogoloficial/

Guaynabo Gol SC was a Puerto Rican association football club from Guaynabo that used to play in the Liga Puerto Rico.

== History ==
Guaynabo Gol SC joined the nascent Liga Puerto Rico for its inaugural season in 2018/19. It went on to finish in fourth place of eight teams. The club began the 2019/20 campaign which was eventually abandoned because of the COVID-19 pandemic. Guaynabo Gol return to the league in 2021 and continue to compete in the league unitl going into a hiatus for the 2022-23 season. They once again returned to the league to compete in the 2023 Apertura season, their last season as Guaynabo Gol SC.

In 2023 Guaynabo Gol SC rebranded as Guaynabo FC

== Domestic history ==
Key

Champion Runners-up 3rd Place

Season	League							Domestic Cup	Notes
Season	Div.	Pos.	Pl.	W	D	L	P	Domestic Cup	Notes
2018/19	1st	4	21	11	2	8	35	Semifinals	
2019/20	1st	N/A	16	10	0	6	30		Season abandoned because of COVID-19 pandemic

=== Year-by-year ===
Season	LPR Pro									Playoffs	CFU Club Championship	Top goalscorer		Managers
Season	Div.	Pos.	Pl.	W	D	L	GS	GA	P	Playoffs	CFU Club Championship	Name	League	Managers
2018-19	1st	6th	21	6	5	10	28	37	23	Semi-finals	Did not enter	(Puerto Rico)	-	(Puerto Rico)
2019-20	1st	4th	16	10	0	6	41	34	30	Cancelled	Did not enter	(Puerto Rico)	-	(Puerto Rico)
2020-21	1st	Season Cancelled due to COVID-19												(Puerto Rico)
2021	1st	7th	6	0	1	5	6	43	1	DNQ	Did not enter	(Puerto Rico)	-	(Puerto Rico)
2022	1st	6th	14	5	0	9	22	30	15	DNQ	Did not enter	(Puerto Rico)	-	(Puerto Rico)
2022-23	Apertura	Went On Hiatus												
2022-23	Clausura	Went On Hiatus												
2023-24	Apertura	7th	7	1	0	6			3	DNQ	Did not enter	(Puerto Rico)	-	(Puerto Rico)
2023-24	Clausura	Merged with Guaynabo FC												
