= Bayamón Fútbol Club =

Association football club based in Bayamón, Puerto Rico

Bayamón FC
- Full name: Bayamón Fútbol Club
- Nickname: Vaqueros (Cowboys)
- Founded: 1999; 27 years ago
- Stadium: Juan Ramón Loubriel Stadium; Bayamón, Puerto Rico
- Capacity: 12,500
- Chairman: (Puerto Rico) Alberto Santiago
- Manager: (Spain) Delfin Ferreres
- League: Liga Puerto Rico
- 2024 Clausura: Regular Season: 5th
| Home colours | Away colours |

Bayamón Fútbol Club is a Puerto Rican professional football club. The team is based in Bayamón and founded in 1999. They play their home games at Juan Ramon Loubriel Stadium. The club is a member of David Villa's DV7 Soccer Academy.

== History ==
=== 1999–2005 ===
Bayamón FC was formed in 1999. They began to play in the Liga Mayor de Fútbol Nacional. They were very successful during their period in the league, becoming champions in the years 2000 and 2002, second place in 2003 and third place in 2004.

The team was inactive from 2006 to 2008.

=== 2009 season ===
Bayamón FC played in the first game of the 2009 Puerto Rico Soccer League season against defending champions Sevilla FC, which Sevilla FC won 1–0. Bayamón then defeated Humacao Tornados 8–1 and Guaynabo Fluminense 4–1. After finishing second in the league table, Bayamón captured the playoff championship with a 3–2 aggregate victory over Atléticos de San Juan.

=== 2010–2013 ===
The team did not participate in the Puerto Rico Soccer League for the 2010 and 2011 seasons due to the league's instability. PRSL eventually folded after the 2011 Supercopa tournament. Instead, they played in the Liga Nacional de Fútbol de Puerto Rico, and they were champions during the 2010 and 2011 seasons.

=== 2014 season ===
The team was renamed Puerto Rico BFC and was expected to play in the National Premier Soccer League. In the end the team never played in the league, but still qualified to the CONCACAF Champions League by winning their matches in the 2014 CFU Club Championship. Francisco Arias was their head coach during the 2014 season.

=== 2016: Partnering with David Villa ===
In January 2016, it was announced that Bayamón FC would join legendary Spanish striker David Villa on his new project of building soccer academies worldwide. Bayamón FC became the first academy from the DV7 program.

Delfín Ferreres joined the coaching staff of the Bayamón FC senior team during the PRSL Clausura 2016 Tournament, which they won.

=== 2017 season ===
Bayamon snatched up former Quintana Academy captain Luis Bermudes following the teams decision not to participate in the first division in 2017.

=== 2018–19 season ===
Following the exit of Delfín Ferreres, Marco Vélez was appointed Head Coach for the 2018 season. Bayamón hosted their annual Bayamón Cup, losing in the finals on penalty shootout against Blazers FC.

From March 2018, they played in the Puerto Rican Football Federation Preparatory Tournament. With a dominant winning streak, Bayamón secured their spot in the semi-finals stage. Bayamón won the title after winning 1–0 against GPS Puerto Rico.

In August 2018, it was announced that Bayamón FC will participate in the inaugural season of the Liga Puerto Rico. Spanish coach Josep Ferré took charge of the team in September 2018.

Bayamón FC finished runners-up in the Liga Puerto Rico after losing the final in penalty shootout against Metropolitan FA. However they ended up winning the second edition of the Copa Luis Villarejo defeating Metropolitan FA 4-2 in the final.

=== 2019-20 season ===
In July 2019, it was announced that Delfí Ferreres will take charge of the team.

=== 2021-present ===
In March 2021, it was announced that Bayamón FC agreed to a professional partnership with newly formed USL Championship team Queensboro FC.

In December 2021, Bayamón FC became champions of the 2021 Liga Puerto Rico after defeating Metropolitan FA 1-2 in the final match played at the Mayagüez Athletics Stadium.

== International performance ==
=== 2010 ===
In March 2010, Bayamón FC debuted in the Caribbean Football Union's 2010 CFU Club Championship, qualifier for the 2010–11 CONCACAF Champions League. Bayamón had Costa Rica international defender Kendall Waston in their squad. The club, along Saint Vincent Motor Systems 3 of Saint Vincent and the Grenadines, had already qualified to the second round due to Elite SC's retirement and Defense Force's group change, playing two games to determine the group's winner. The first game was originally scheduled for 25 March 2010, but Systems 3's personnel only arrived partially, forcing the club to replace the date with an exhibition game against the Puerto Rico Islanders, dropping the game 0–1. On 27 March 2010, both teams began the series at Juan Ramón Loubriel Stadium, with Bayamón FC defeating Systems 3 by a score of 4–1. Both teams tied 2–1 in the second game, keeping the global score in favor of the local team, which clinched the group's first place.

Bayamón advanced through the second round after beating Avenues United 8–2 in global score. They became the second Puerto Rican club to reach the Final Round along with Puerto Rico Islanders. The final round was played in Trinidad where Bayamón faced the Islanders, San Juan Jabloteh and local champions Joe Public FC. A 3–0 loss against the Islanders, put Bayamón down in the standings followed by another loss against San Juan Jabloteh. In the final match, Bayamón got their most memorable win against local champions Joe Public FC with a 3–1 score.

=== 2012 ===
After winning the Liga Nacional de Fútbol de Puerto Rico, Bayamón traveled to Haiti where they played at the 2012 CFU Club Championship facing local clubs Victory Sportif Club and Baltimore Sportif Club. They lost both matches only scoring a goal.

=== 2013 ===
For the 2013 CFU Club Championship, Bayamón FC signed legendary Costa Rican international Walter Centeno. They traveled to Kingston, Jamaica where they played on the Group 2 facing Haiti's Valencia, and Jamaica's Boy's Town and Portmore United. They lost all three matches managing to score one goal on the first match.

=== 2014 ===
Bayamón returned to the CFU Club Championship in 2014. They hosted matches from Group 1 facing Centro Dominguito, USR Sainte-Rose and Bodden Town. After a 5–0 win against Bodden Town, Bayamón tied in the next two matches winning the group by goal difference after USR Sainte-Rose and Centro Dominguito all tied with 5 points.

Bayamón advanced to the Final Round for the second time in their history. However, the Final Round was cancelled after one of the teams couldn't make it, qualifying Bayamón to the CONCACAF Champions League for the first time in history and becoming the second Puerto Rican team to do so.

=== 2014 CONCACAF Champions League ===
In 2014, Bayamón FC played in the CONCACAF Champions League, becoming the second Puerto Rican club to do so. The team qualified after winning all of their matches at the CFU Club Championship.

They played in Group 8 facing legendary Club América from Mexico and Comunicaciones from Guatemala. The team lost all of their matched but managed to score two goals on the two games played against Club América.

=== 2022-present ===
After winning the 2021 Liga Puerto Rico, Bayamón FC were hosts in the 2022 Caribbean Club Shield played in Puerto Rico in April 2022. Bayamón FC were crowned champions of the 2022 edition after defeating Inter Moengotapoe 2-1 in the final celebrated at the Mayagüez Athletics Stadium.

== Stadium ==
Bayamón FC plays their matches at Bayamón Soccer Complex. Bayamón FC has been operating and managing the facilities of the Bayamón Soccer Complex since 2009.

== Players and staff ==
=== Current roster ===
The current roster september 2024:

The current roster: Note: Flags indicate national team as defined under FIFA eligibility rules; some limited exceptions apply. Players may hold more than one non-FIFA nationality.

| No. | Pos. | Nation | Player |
|---|---|---|---|
| — | GK | PUR | José Gabriel Arroyo |
| — | GK | PUR | Leftie Millán |
| — | GK | PUR | Marcos Rivera |
| — | GK | USA | Jaime Ibarra |
| — | DF | PUR | Joel Rodríguez |
| — | DF | PUR | Kevin Borja |
| — | DF | PUR | Walter Rodríguez |
| — | DF | PUR | Eitan Solomiany |
| — | DF | PUR | José López |
| — | DF | PUR | Carlos Rosario |
| — | DF | ESP | Marc Arnau |
| — | DF | PUR | Esteban Espinosa |
| — | DF | PUR | Emmanuel D'Andrea |
| — | DF | PUR | Luis Cosme |
| — | DF | BRA | Víctor Bonmati |
| — | MF | PUR | Deniz Bozkurt |
| — | MF | PUR | Eduardo Jimenez |

| No. | Pos. | Nation | Player |
|---|---|---|---|
| — | MF | PUR | Jeimax Osorio |
| — | MF | PUR | José Luis López |
| — | MF | PUR | Agustín Ortega |
| — | MF | PUR | Joseph Villafañe |
| — | MF | PUR | Ryan López |
| — | MF | PUR | Alexis Chaparro |
| — | MF | PUR | Samuel Soto |
| — | MF | PUR | Andrés Cabrero |
| — | FW | PUR | Jan Mateo |
| — | FW | PUR | Jorge Rivera |
| — | FW | PUR | Lemuel Sálamo |
| — | FW | PUR | Kevin Montañez |
| — | FW | PUR | Carlos Siaca |
| — | FW | ARG | Adrián Oviedo |
| — | FW | COL | Christian Niño |
| — | FW | PUR | Jorge Bermúdez |
| — | FW | PUR | Carlos Rivera |

=== Current technical staff ===
Head Coach

- (Spain) Delfi Ferreres

Assistant Coach

- (Puerto Rico) Fernando Reyes

Coach

- (Puerto Rico) Javier Torres

=== Notable former players ===
- Kendall Waston - Costa Rica National Football Team
- Walter Centeno - Costa Rica National Football Team
- Alexis Rivera Curet - Puerto Rico national football team
- Eric Reyes - Puerto Rico national football team

=== Year-by-year ===
| Season | PRSL | | | | | | | | | Overall | CFU Club Championship | Top goalscorer | | Managers |
| Season | Div. | Pos. | Pl. | W | D | L | GS | GA | P | Overall | CFU Club Championship | Name | League | Managers |
|---|---|---|---|---|---|---|---|---|---|---|---|---|---|---|
| 2016 | Apertura | 4th | 13 | 8 | 0 | 5 | 34 | 17 | 24 | 3rd | Did not enter | (Puerto Rico) | | (Puerto Rico) |
| 2016 | Clausura | 1st | 10 | 8 | 2 | 0 | 37 | 10 | 26 | 3rd | Did not enter | (Puerto Rico) | | (Puerto Rico) |
| 2017 | | 2nd | 9 | 8 | 0 | 1 | 39 | 8 | 24 | 2nd | Did not enter | (Puerto Rico) | | (Puerto Rico) |
| Season | LPR Pro | | | | | | | | | Playoffs | CFU Club Championship | Top goalscorer | | Managers |
| Season | Div. | Pos. | Pl. | W | D | L | GS | GA | P | Playoffs | CFU Club Championship | Name | League | Managers |
| 2018-19 | 1st | 2nd | 21 | 14 | 4 | 3 | 85 | 26 | 46 | 2nd | Did not enter | (Spain) Josep Becerra | 32 | (Puerto Rico) |
| 2019-20 | 1st | 1st | 14 | 12 | 2 | 0 | 75 | 6 | 38 | Cancelled | Did not enter | (Puerto Rico) Jose Lopez | 13 | (Puerto Rico) |
| 2020-21 | 1st | Season Cancelled due to COVID-19 | | | | | | | | | | | | (Puerto Rico) |
| 2021 | 1st | 3rd | 6 | 4 | 0 | 2 | 23 | 11 | 12 | 1st | Did not enter | (Puerto Rico) | - | (Puerto Rico) |
| 2022 | 1st | 2nd | 14 | 9 | 2 | 3 | 49 | 11 | 29 | Semi-finals | Did not enter | (Puerto Rico) | - | (Puerto Rico) |
| 2022-23 | Apertura | 3rd | 8 | 2 | 2 | 4 | 9 | 13 | 8 | Semi-finals | Did not enter | (Puerto Rico) | - | (Puerto Rico) |
| 2022-23 | Clausura | Went On Hiatus | | | | | | | | | | | | |
| 2023-24 | Apertura | 5th | 7 | 3 | 0 | 4 | | | 9 | Semi-finals | Did not enter | (Puerto Rico) Jan Mateo | 4 | (Spain) Josep Becerra |
| 2023-24 | Clausura | 5th | 7 | 3 | 1 | 3 | 17 | 13 | 10 | DNQ | Did not enter | (Puerto Rico) Jan Mateo | 6 | (Spain) Josep Becerra |

== Honors ==
=== Domestic ===
- Liga Mayor de Fútbol Nacional
  - Champions (2): 1999–00, 2001–02
  - Runners-up (1): 2002–03
- Puerto Rico Soccer League
  - Champions (1): 2009
  - Runners-up (1): 2017
- Liga Nacional de Fútbol de Puerto Rico
  - Champions (2): 2011, 2012
  - Runners-up (3): 2009, 2010, 2013
- Liga Puerto Rico
  - Champions (1): 2021
  - Runners-up (1): 2018–19
- FPF Torneo Preparatorio
  - Champions (1): 2018
- Copa Luis Villarejo
  - Champions (1): 2019

=== International ===
==== Regional ====
- CONCACAF Caribbean Club Shield
  - Champions (1): 2022

== Bayamón FC Femenino ==
Bayamón FC Femenino is the women's team of Bayamón FC. They play their home games at Bayamón Soccer Complex.

=== History ===
Bayamón FC women's team was formed in 2010. The first team was coached by Elgy Morales. Leander "Cuba" Betancourt took charge of the team in 2012, making the team one of the top sides in Puerto Rico winning the Apertura 2012, Clausura 2013, Apertura 2014, Clausura 2014, Clausura 2015 and Apertura 2016 tournaments of the Liga Superior Femenina.

In July 2018, Bayamón FC won the Offside Magazine Cup.

They currently play in the Liga Puerto Rico, opening their inaugural 2018–19 season with a 5–0 win against Guaynabo Gol SC on 21 October 2018.

Bayamón FC won the 2019 Copa Luis Villarejo after defeating SPADI FC 2-1 in the final.

Fernando Reyes was appointed as Head Coach for the 2019-20 season with striker Karina Socarrás rejoining the team.

=== Players and staff ===
==== Current roster ====
As of July 2018 The current roster: Note: Flags indicate national team as defined under FIFA eligibility rules; some limited exceptions apply. Players may hold more than one non-FIFA nationality.

| No. | Pos. | Nation | Player |
|---|---|---|---|
| 1 | GK | PUR | Nicole Hernández |
| 25 | GK | PUR | María Crespo |
| 2 | DF | PUR | Alondra Nieves |
| 6 | DF | PUR | Valeria Santana |
| 15 | DF | PUR | Génesis Sierra |
| 8 | DF | PUR | Valeria Torres |
| 20 | DF | PUR | Neymara Sifre |
| 13 | DF | PUR | Daniela Pérez |
| 17 | DF | PUR | Carol Pérez |
| 3 | DF | PUR | Silene Reyes |
| 9 | DF | PUR | Yomaries Santiago |
| 14 | MF | PUR | Sofía Rivera |
| 5 | MF | PUR | Carolina Orria |

| No. | Pos. | Nation | Player |
|---|---|---|---|
| 7 | MF | PUR | Alyson Núñez |
| 22 | MF | PUR | Paola Badillo |
| 4 | MF | PUR | Amanda Jackson |
| 11 | MF | PUR | Ana Sierra |
| 99 | MF | PUR | Adriana Tirado |
| 27 | MF | PUR | Annie Lee Méndez |
| 16 | MF | PUR | Rose Tirado |
| 12 | MF | PUR | Alitza Alemán |
| 19 | FW | PUR | Kathia Ayala |
| 10 | FW | SKN | Iyanla Bailey |
| 21 | FW | PUR | Andrea Ocasio |
| 23 | FW | PUR | Stephanie López |
| 18 | FW | PUR | Ángela Díaz |

==== Current technical staff ====
Head Coach

- (Puerto Rico) Fernando Reyes

Assistant Coach

- (Spain) José Luis "Majo" López

Trainer

- (Puerto Rico) Jaime Ruíz

== Academy ==
The club currently has 28 teams within the organization including women, senior team development, and boys and girls youth teams. Currently, Bayamón FC has over 500 registered players and thus are the biggest football club in Puerto Rico.

== Club crest ==
Club crest (1999–2019)
