= 2008 Puerto Rico Soccer League season =

Puerto Rico Soccer League
- Season: 2008
- Champions: Sevilla FC Puerto Rico
- CFU Club Championship: Sevilla FC Puerto Rico; Puerto Rico Islanders FC (seeded)
- CONCACAF Champions League: Puerto Rico Islanders FC (CFU Club Championship Runner-up)
- Matches played: 59
- Goals scored: 251 (4.25 per match)

The 2008 Puerto Rico Soccer League Playoffs is the first year the tournament has been held. It is the championship of the Puerto Rico Soccer League. The format is set up for the top 4 teams from the league playing in the Tournament. These teams play in the Semi-finals with the winner of each match going on to the Championship game.

== 2008 Puerto Rico Soccer League playoffs ==
Semi-finals
1 Sevilla FC	2
3 Atletico San Juan FC	0
2 River Plate Ponce	2
4 Guaynabo Fluminense	1

Final
1 Sevilla FC	2
2 River Plate Ponce	1

== Champions ==
Sevilla FC won the Championship as they defeated River Plate Ponce 2-1 in the final.

== Segunda División Season Standings ==
Div.	Southeast			Northeast			North		
Pos.	Team	GP	Pts.	Team	GP	Pts.	Team	GP	Pts.
1	Maunabo Leones FC	9	22	Real Atlántico FC de Aguadilla	8	20	San Juan Sharks FC	8	24
2	Guayanilla Pumas FC	8	17	Aguadilla Spartans FC	8	19	Club Deportivo Gallitos UPR	8	13
3	Yabucoa Borikén CF	9	15	Club Atlético de Levittown	9	17	San Juan United FC	8	11
4	Huracán FC de Caguas 2	8	13	Vega Baja Fénix FC	9	6	Academia de Quintana 2	7	10
5	CA River Plate Ponce 2	7	3	Indios de Mayaguez FC	8	6	Gigantes de Carolina FC 2	8	4
6	CF Tornados de Humacao 2	7	0	Puerto Rico Islanders FC C	8	4	Guaynabo Fluminense FC 2	5	1
The first teams from each division advanced to the PlayOff, as well as the best second team.

=== PlayOffs ===
Semi-finals
Maunabo Leones FC	3
Aguadilla Spartans FC	0
Real Atlántico FC de Aguadilla	0
San Juan Sharks FC	3

Final
Maunabo Leones FC	1
San Juan Sharks FC	4

Puerto Rico Soccer League
New championship	2008; Champion; Sevilla FC Puerto Rico; First title	Succeeded by Bayamón FC
