= Álvaro Betancourt =

Puerto Rican footballer (born 1994)

Personal information
- Full name: Álvaro E. Betancourt
- Date of birth: 8 February 1994 (age 32)
- Place of birth: Caguas, Puerto Rico
- Height: 1.75 m (5 ft 9 in)
- Position: Midfielder

Youth career
- 2002–2009: Fraigcomar

College career
Years	Team	Apps	(Gls)
2012–2013	Valparaiso Crusaders	6	(0)

Senior career*
Years	Team	Apps	(Gls)
2009–2010	High Performance FC		(1+)
2011	Conquistadores de Guaynabo		(1+)
2014–2016	Bayamón		
2017	Metropolitan FA		(0)
Total			(2+)

International career
2012–2013	Puerto Rico U20	5	(0)
2015	Puerto Rico U23	2	(0)
2011–2015	Puerto Rico	5	(0)
- * Club domestic league appearances and goals

Álvaro E. Betancourt (born 8 February 1994) is a Puerto Rican retired international footballer who played as a midfielder. He appeared at the senior level for High Performance FC, Conquistadores de Guaynabo, Bayamón, and Metropolitan FA, split around a two-year stint at Valparaiso University.

A native of Caguas, Puerto Rico, Betancourt played youth football for Fraigcomar while attending the Colegio San Ignacio de Loyola. He made his senior debut at 15 years old, spending two seasons with High Performance FC followed by a year with Conquistadores de Guaynabo. He left his home island to attend college in the United States, spending two years with the men's soccer program at Valparaiso. After returning to Puerto Rico, Betancourt played the sport for four more years, splitting time between Bayamón and Metropolitan FA. He stepped away from the game in 2017, aged just 23.

At international level, Betancourt captained the Puerto Rico U20 side in 2013 CONCACAF U-20 Championship qualifying and appeared at the 2013 CONCACAF U-20 Championship. He earned his senior debut for the nation on 14 November 2011, going on to represent Puerto Rico five times. Following the end of his senior career, Betancourt appeared for the under-23 national team in the 2015 CONCACAF Men's Olympic Qualifying Championship qualification stages.

== Early life ==
Born in Caguas, Puerto Rico, Betancourt attended the Colegio San Ignacio de Loyola in San Juan. He began playing football when he was eight years old, spending seven years at the youth level with Fraigcomar and winning a national title in 2007. While at the Colegio San Ignacio, Betancourt was twice named the All-Around MVP of the Puerto Rico High School Athletic Alliance; along with playing football, he also ran track and field.

== Career ==
=== Early career in Puerto Rico ===
Betancourt began playing senior football at the age of 15, appearing in the Liga Nacional de Fútbol de Puerto Rico with High Performance FC. He took part in the first match in High Performance history on 26 July 2009, scoring a 52nd-minute goal in a 5–2 defeat against the Bayamón reserve team. While appearing at the senior level for the club, he continued to play for their U17 team and won two Puerto Rican national titles.

After High Performance folded following the 2010 season, Betancourt joined Conquistadores de Guaynabo for the 2011 Liga Nacional de Fútbol de Puerto Rico season. He played for the senior and U17 team during the club's only season of existence, missing time due to national team call-ups before going to the United States to play in college.

=== College ===
Betancourt committed to play college soccer at Valparaiso University under head coach Mike Avery, becoming the first senior national team player in the history of the Crusader men's soccer program. On 29 September 2012, Betancourt made his collegiate debut for Valpo, playing nine minutes off the bench in a 1–0 defeat against UIC. He found playing time hard to come by as a freshman, however, as that match against the Flames marked his only appearance of the season. As a sophomore, Betancourt was selected to play more for the team, making five appearances for the Crusaders. He picked up a yellow card in a 2–1 victory over Michigan State in September and played a career-high 31 minutes in a loss to Kentucky in mid-October. Betancourt left Valparaiso following his sophomore year and returned to Puerto Rico, after having played in just six matches during his time with the Crusaders.

=== Return from college ===
After leaving Valparaiso following his sophomore year, Betancourt returned to Puerto Rico to get more playing time and joined Bayamón ahead of the club's run in the 2014–15 CONCACAF Champions League. He made his debut for the club, and played his first match at continental level, on 7 August 2014 in a 5–0 defeat to Guatemalan club Comunicaciones. During the 2015 season, Betancourt wore the captain's armband for Bayamón in the Liga Nacional while helping the club qualify for the playoffs. He played with Bayamón through the 2016 season, appearing for the side in the 2016 Copa Luis Villarejo after the 2016 Liga Nacional de Fútbol de Puerto Rico was cancelled.

Betancourt finished his playing career by spending the 2017 season in the Puerto Rico Soccer League with Metropolitan FA. He had debuted for the club in the preseason Copa Bayamón and was assigned to play for Metropolitan's 'A' team.

== International career ==
Betancourt captained the Puerto Rico U20 national team in the 2013 CONCACAF U-20 Championship qualifying stage, playing all three matches in the first round of the Caribbean zone. He was not called up for the final round due to academic commitments at Valparaiso, but was credited as part of the first male Puerto Rican team to qualify for a CONCACAF tournament through a Caribbean qualifying tournament. He was named to the Puerto Rican squad for the 2013 CONCACAF U-20 Championship and contested both matches; the side were defeated by Jamaica and Panama and failed to qualify for the knockout rounds. Betancourt earned five caps during his eligibility for the U20 side.

The last time Betancourt would represent Puerto Rico was at the U23 level, less than a month after earning what would turn out to be his final senior cap. He was called up to participate in the 2015 CONCACAF Men's Olympic Qualifying Championship qualification stage and played in both of Puerto Rico's matches in the tournament. Following a draw against Saint Vincent and the Grenadines and a defeat against Trinidad and Tobago, Puerto Rico finished in third place in their group and missed out on advancement to the 2015 CONCACAF Men's Olympic Qualifying Championship.

=== Senior career ===
Betancourt was first called up by the Puerto Rico national team in 2011, training with the side in August of that year and appearing on the bench for a 2014 World Cup qualifier against Canada on 6 September. He made his international debut in Puerto Rico's final World Cup qualifying match, playing against Saint Lucia on 14 November 2011. Betancourt earned three more caps in 2012, with all three coming in friendlies against Nicaragua. On 26 February, with the scoreline level at 1–1, he was sent off in the 56th minute after picking up a second yellow card; Puerto Rico went on to lose that match 4–1.

After three years without an appearance at senior level, Betancourt was called back up in June 2015 for the first matches under new manager Garabet Avedissian. Betancourt earned his fifth and final international cap against Bermuda on 5 June, replacing Michael Fernández in the 84th minute of a 1–1 draw. He was named to the bench twice more during that international window, but was not selected to play during a pair of 2018 World Cup qualifiers against Grenada.

== Career statistics ==
Appearances and goals by national team and year
National team	Year	Apps	Goals
Puerto Rico	2011	1	0
Puerto Rico	2012	3	0
Puerto Rico	2013	0	0
Puerto Rico	2014	0	0
Puerto Rico	2015	1	0
Total		5	0
