= 2014 Liga Nacional de Fútbol de Puerto Rico =

Liga Nacional de Fútbol de Puerto Rico
- Season: 2014
- Champions: Guayama FC
- Matches: 132
- Goals: 250 (1.89 per match)

The 2014 Liga Nacional de Fútbol de Puerto Rico is 6th season Puerto Rico's top-division football league.

== Standings ==
Pos	Team	Pld	W	D	L	GF	GA	GD	Pts	Qualification
1	Guayama FC	11	10	0	1	37	6	+31	30	2015 CFU Club Championship
2	Yabuco FC	11	8	2	1	26	9	+17	26	
3	Brazilian Soccer Academy	11	7	1	3	22	14	+8	22	
4	Spartans SDSP	11	6	2	3	25	10	+15	20	
5	Isabella Soccer Club	11	6	2	3	27	13	+14	20	
6	Puerto Rico United	11	5	1	5	23	16	+7	16	
7	Leones de Maunabo	11	4	3	4	23	18	+5	15	
8	EFBR	11	4	2	5	13	19	−6	14	
9	Koricancha FC	11	4	1	6	20	22	−2	13	
10	Universitarios FC	11	1	4	6	10	16	−6	7	
11	Fenix SC	11	1	2	8	14	31	−17	5	
12	Alianza Yabucoena	11	0	0	11	10	76	−66	0	

Source: FIFA.com and eurosport.com
Rules for classification: 1) points; 2) goal difference; 3) number of goals scored.
