= 2018 CONCACAF Women's U-17 Championship squads =

The following is a list of squads for each national team competing at the 2018 CONCACAF Women's U-17 Championship. The tournament will take place during April 2018 in Nicaragua and June 2018 in the United States. It will be the sixth U-17 age group competition organised by the CONCACAF.

== Group A ==
=== Nicaragua ===
Manager: Jennifer Fernández

No.	Pos.	Player	Date of birth (age)	Club
1	GK	Valeria Roblero	12 December 2002 (aged 15)	(Nicaraguan Football Federation) FSF
2	DF	Reyna Roblero	16 April 2001 (aged 17)	(Nicaraguan Football Federation) FSF
3	DF	Ana Silva	2 January 2002 (aged 16)	(Nicaraguan Football Federation) Managua F.C.
4	MF	Natalie Orellana	4 February 2001 (aged 17)	Unattached
5	DF	Anamary Alemán	27 March 2001 (aged 17)	(Nicaraguan Football Federation) ANS
6	DF	Vanessa Mendoza	12 January 2002 (aged 16)	(Nicaraguan Football Federation) C. C. D. R. Garabito
7	DF	Jonnie Sánchez	28 January 2002 (aged 16)	(United States Soccer Federation) Legends FC
8	MF	Heysell Martínez	10 May 2001 (aged 16)	(Nicaraguan Football Federation) Somotillo
9	FW	Nohelia Velásquez	16 February 2002 (aged 16)	Unattached
10	MF	Edy Stephania Pérez	5 December 2002 (aged 15)	(Nicaraguan Football Federation) Las Leyendas
11	FW	Rosa Mena	22 March 2003 (aged 15)	(Nicaraguan Football Federation) CD EL 26
12	GK	Sofia Traversari	21 January 2004 (aged 14)	(Nicaraguan Football Federation) ANS
13	DF	Yorcelly Humphreys	3 September 2001 (aged 16)	(Nicaraguan Football Federation) Las Leyendas
14	DF	Alisson Talavera	25 August 2002 (aged 15)	(Nicaraguan Football Federation) Águilas de Leon
15	MF	Merykey Delgadillo	22 March 2004 (aged 14)	Unattached
16	FW	Alexa Medrano	10 December 2001 (aged 16)	Unattached
17	MF	Andrea Martínez	29 November 2001 (aged 16)	(Nicaraguan Football Federation) ANS
18	FW	Stephanie Ruiz	20 July 2002 (aged 15)	Unattached
19	FW	Lauren Castillo	13 February 2002 (aged 16)	Unattached
20	DF	Giulina Caprotti	1 March 2002 (aged 16)	Unattached

=== Mexico ===
Mexico named their squad on 14 April 2018.

Manager: Mónica Vergara

No.	Pos.	Player	Date of birth (age)	Club
1	GK	Jaidy Gutiérrez	24 October 2001 (aged 16)	(Mexican Football Federation) América
2	DF	Reyna Reyes	16 February 2001 (aged 17)	(United States Soccer Federation) FC Dallas
3	DF	Tanna Sánchez	21 December 2001 (aged 16)	(Mexican Football Federation) Tec Monterrey Puebla
4	DF	Karen Gómez	1 August 2001 (aged 16)	(Mexican Football Federation) Pachuca
5	DF	Ximena Ríos	26 July 2001 (aged 16)	(Mexican Football Federation) América
6	MF	Noemí Granados	30 September 2002 (aged 15)	(Mexican Football Federation) Veracruz
7	FW	Nayeli Díaz	10 October 2001 (aged 16)	(United States Soccer Federation) Arsenal FC
8	MF	Nicole Pérez	30 August 2001 (aged 16)	(Mexican Football Federation) Guadalajara
9	FW	Vanessa Buso	21 May 2001 (aged 16)	(United States Soccer Federation) Legends FC
10	FW	Alison González	31 January 2002 (aged 16)	(Mexican Football Federation) UANL
11	MF	Anette Vázquez	11 March 2002 (aged 16)	(Mexican Football Federation) Guadalajara
12	GK	Ana Ruvalcaba	24 August 2001 (aged 16)	(Mexican Football Federation) Guadalajara
13	DF	Aislinn García	30 August 2001 (aged 16)	(Mexican Football Federation) Pachuca
14	DF	Nicole Soto	8 July 2001 (aged 16)	(United States Soccer Federation) So Cal Blues
15	DF	Jana Gutiérrez	25 October 2003 (aged 14)	(Mexican Football Federation) América
16	MF	Yanín Madrid	28 June 2002 (aged 15)	(Mexican Football Federation) Pachuca
17	FW	Natalia Mauleón	4 February 2002 (aged 16)	(Mexican Football Federation) Toluca
18	MF	Mariana Elizondo	10 October 2002 (aged 15)	(Mexican Football Federation) UANL
19	MF	Rebeca Villuendas	30 June 2001 (aged 16)	(Mexican Football Federation) Macro Soccer
20	MF	Aylín Aviléz	18 May 2003 (aged 14)	(Mexican Football Federation) CEFOR Baja

=== Puerto Rico ===
Manager: (Poland) Shek Borkowski

No.	Pos.	Player	Date of birth (age)	Club
1	GK	Cristina Roque	January 6, 2001 (aged 17)	(United States Soccer Federation) Florida Kraze
2	DF	Daniela Pérez	March 11, 2001 (aged 17)	(Puerto Rican Football Federation) PRHP
3	DF	Liliana Graves	June 21, 2002 (aged 15)	(United States Soccer Federation) Weston
4	DF	Mikaela Jennings	June 9, 2002 (aged 15)	(United States Soccer Federation) NY XFC
5	DF	Bianca Rosado	April 8, 2002 (aged 16)	(Puerto Rican Football Federation) GPS
6	MF	Rocío Pérez	July 23, 2002 (aged 15)	(Puerto Rican Football Federation) Gladiadoras de Dorado
7	MF	Belerica Oquendo	February 12, 2001 (aged 17)	(United States Soccer Federation) Dallas Kicks
8	MF	María Luisa Colón	June 25, 2001 (aged 16)	(United States Soccer Federation) Boston
9	MF	Soleil Maldonado	March 15, 2001 (aged 17)	(Puerto Rican Football Federation) Caribbean Stars
10	FW	Yarielys Maldonado	July 23, 2001 (aged 16)	(Puerto Rican Football Federation) Gladiadoras de Dorado
11	FW	Zoemi Cobián	January 28, 2001 (aged 17)	(Puerto Rican Football Federation) GPS
12	FW	Gabrielle Cimino	March 8, 2002 (aged 16)	(United States Soccer Federation) Coral Gables
13	MF	Leilany Rivera	August 2, 2001 (aged 16)	(Puerto Rican Football Federation) Gladiadoras de Dorado
14	MF	Mariana Varela	March 11, 2002 (aged 16)	(Puerto Rican Football Federation) GPS
15	MF	Juliette Wolpert	November 12, 2001 (aged 16)	(Puerto Rican Football Federation) PRHP
16	MF	Isabel Cacho	February 26, 2002 (aged 16)	(Puerto Rican Football Federation) Fraigcomar
17	FW	Isabelle Rivera	March 22, 2002 (aged 16)	(Puerto Rican Football Federation) Mirabelli SA
18	DF	Silene Reyes	February 2, 2003 (aged 15)	(Puerto Rican Football Federation) Bayamón
19	FW	Kalyssa Muniz	April 8, 2002 (aged 16)	(United States Soccer Federation) FSA FC
20	GK	JLo Varada	February 2, 2003 (aged 15)	(Puerto Rican Football Federation) PRHP

=== Haiti ===
Manager: Wilner Étienne & Fiorda Charles

No.	Pos.	Player	Date of birth (age)	Club
1	GK	Madelina Fleuriot	28 October 2003 (aged 14)	(Haitian Football Federation) Camp Nous
2	MF	Dougenie Joseph	13 September 2003 (aged 14)	(Haitian Football Federation) Camp Nous
3	DF	Nancy Lindor	18 November 2001 (aged 16)	(Haitian Football Federation) Camp Nous
4	DF	Ruthny Mathurin	14 January 2001 (aged 17)	(Haitian Football Federation) Camp Nous
5	DF	Estericove Joseph	5 February 2003 (aged 15)	(Haitian Football Federation) Camp Nous
6	MF	Angeline Gustave	30 January 2001 (aged 17)	(Haitian Football Federation) Camp Nous
7	MF	Abaina Louis	29 November 2001 (aged 16)	(Haitian Football Federation) Camp Nous
8	MF	Dieunika Jean Baptiste	27 February 2001 (aged 17)	(Haitian Football Federation) Aigle Brillant
9	FW	Vladine Mervilus	11 May 2001 (aged 16)	(Haitian Football Federation) Camp Nous
10	MF	Melchie Dumonay	17 August 2003 (aged 14)	(Haitian Football Federation) Camp Nous
11	DF	Elisabeth Brivil	15 October 2003 (aged 14)	(Haitian Football Federation) Camp Nous
12	GK	Nahomie Ambroise	13 November 2003 (aged 14)	(Haitian Football Federation) Camp Nous
13	DF	Rachelle Caremus	3 February 2003 (aged 15)	(Haitian Football Federation) Camp Nous
14	MF	Betina Petit	1 August 2003 (aged 14)	(Haitian Football Federation) Camp Nous
15	MF	Danielle Etienne	16 January 2001 (aged 17)	(United States Soccer Federation) New York City
16	MF	Sheelove Joseph (Note: The player was called in the original squad which had to play in April 2018, but was not called back in the squad which played in June 2018 when the tournament resumed in the United States.)	21 July 2001 (aged 16)	(Haitian Football Federation) Camp Nous
17	FW	Maille Jean	24 August 2001 (aged 16)	(Haitian Football Federation) Camp Nous
18	MF	Beurnengy Adrien	22 March 2001 (aged 17)	(Haitian Football Federation) Camp Nous
19	FW	Milan Pierre	23 April 2002 (aged 15)	(United States Soccer Federation) Weston
20	FW	Flero Surpris	16 January 2003 (aged 15)	(Haitian Football Federation) Camp Nous
21	MF	Isabelle Bernier (Note: The player was not called in the original squad which had to play in April 2018, but was called in the squad which played in June 2018 when the tournament resumed in the United States.)	11 September 2002 (aged 15)	

== Group B ==
=== United States ===
United States named their squad on 28 March 2018.

Manager: (England) Mark Carr

No.	Pos.	Player	Date of birth (age)	Club
1	GK	Angelina Anderson	March 22, 2001 (aged 17)	(United States Soccer Federation) Mustang
2	DF	Makenna Morris	April 26, 2002 (aged 15)	(United States Soccer Federation) Bethesda
3	DF	Kate Wiesner	February 11, 2001 (aged 17)	(United States Soccer Federation) LA FC Slammers
4	DF	Talia DellaPeruta	April 19, 2002 (aged 16)	(United States Soccer Federation) NTH Tophat
5	DF	Kennedy Wesley	March 8, 2001 (aged 17)	(United States Soccer Federation) So Cal Blues
6	MF	Astrid Wheeler	August 20, 2001 (aged 16)	(United States Soccer Federation) Concorde Fire
7	FW	Samantha Meza	November 7, 2001 (aged 16)	(United States Soccer Federation) Solar SC
8	FW	Diana Ordoñez	September 26, 2001 (aged 16)	(United States Soccer Federation) FC Dallas
9	MF	Croix Bethune	March 14, 2001 (aged 17)	(United States Soccer Federation) Concorde Fire
10	MF	Mia Fishel	April 30, 2001 (aged 16)	(United States Soccer Federation) San Diego Surf
11	MF	Maya Doms	May 11, 2001 (aged 16)	(United States Soccer Federation) Davis Legacy
12	GK	Julia Dohle	February 6, 2001 (aged 17)	(United States Soccer Federation) New York City
13	FW	Samantha Kroeger	April 28, 2002 (aged 15)	(United States Soccer Federation) World Class FC
14	DF	Smith Hunter	January 4, 2002 (aged 16)	(United States Soccer Federation) Seattle Reign
15	DF	Natalia Staude	April 30, 2001 (aged 16)	(United States Soccer Federation) NTH Tophat
17	MF	Hannah Bebar	September 5, 2001 (aged 16)	(United States Soccer Federation) Eclipse Select
18	FW	Sunshine Fontes	February 25, 2001 (aged 17)	(United States Soccer Federation) Hawaii Rush
19	DF	Michela Agresti	July 24, 2001 (aged 16)	(United States Soccer Federation) FC Stars
20	MF	Sophia Jones	July 17, 2001 (aged 16)	(United States Soccer Federation) San Jose Earthquakes
23	FW	Reilyn Turner	October 18, 2002 (aged 15)	(United States Soccer Federation) So Cal Blues
	FW	Izzy D'Aquila	September 8, 2001 (aged 16)	(United States Soccer Federation) So Cal Blues
	FW	Payton Linnehan	March 25, 2001 (aged 17)	(United States Soccer Federation) FC Stars

=== Costa Rica ===
Costa Rica named their squad on 11 April 2018.

Manager: Harold López

No.	Pos.	Player	Date of birth (age)	Club
1	GK	Fabiana Solano	22 October 2001 (aged 16)	(Costa Rican Football Federation) Desampa 2000
2	DF	Valery Sandoval	19 April 2001 (aged 17)	(Costa Rican Football Federation) CODEA
3	DF	Andrea Capmany	4 March 2001 (aged 17)	(United States Soccer Federation) IMG Academy
4	MF	María Fernanda Murillo	7 May 2002 (aged 15)	(Costa Rican Football Federation) Morpho
5	MF	Alexa Aguilar	11 January 2001 (aged 17)	(Costa Rican Football Federation) CODEA
6	DF	Pamela Gutiérrez	1 April 2001 (aged 17)	(Costa Rican Football Federation) Liberia
7	MF	Nicole Gómez	9 November 2001 (aged 16)	(Costa Rican Football Federation) Arenal Coronado
8	DF	Jeimy Umaña	20 February 2001 (aged 17)	(Costa Rican Football Federation) Arenal Coronado
9	FW	Medolyn Guerrero	7 July 2001 (aged 16)	(Costa Rican Football Federation) AD Pococí
10	MF	Carmen Marín	23 March 2001 (aged 17)	(Canadian Soccer Association) Futuro Academy
11	MF	Priscila Chinchilla	11 July 2001 (aged 16)	(Costa Rican Football Federation) Arenal Coronado
12	FW	María Paula Salas	12 July 2002 (aged 15)	(Costa Rican Football Federation) Deportivo Saprissa
13	DF	Keylin Gómez	13 November 2003 (aged 14)	(Costa Rican Football Federation) Dimas Escazú
14	FW	María Paula Porras	18 March 2002 (aged 16)	(Costa Rican Football Federation) Deportivo Saprissa
15	MF	Daniela Contreras	19 April 2001 (aged 17)	(Costa Rican Football Federation) Dimas Escazú
16	MF	Emily Flores	19 November 2001 (aged 16)	(Costa Rican Football Federation) Suva Sports
17	FW	Kyana Calvo	14 January 2002 (aged 16)	(United States Soccer Federation) Lonestar SC
18	GK	Dislania Chacón	6 January 2002 (aged 16)	(Costa Rican Football Federation) Herediano
19	DF	Gipzy Prieto	20 March 2001 (aged 17)	(Costa Rican Football Federation) AD Pococí
20	DF	Ariana Dobles	23 July 2001 (aged 16)	(Costa Rican Football Federation) CODEA
21	MF	Lisa Villegas	29 September 2003 (aged 14)	

=== Canada ===
Canada named their squad on 7 April 2018.

Manager: Bev Priestman

No.	Pos.	Player	Date of birth (age)	Club
1	GK	Anna Karpenko	April 10, 2002 (aged 16)	(Canadian Soccer Association) Vaughan
2	DF	Élisabeth Tsé	December 7, 2002 (aged 15)	(Canadian Soccer Association) Phénix des Rivières
3	FW	Jayde Riviere	January 22, 2001 (aged 17)	(Canadian Soccer Association) Girls Elite REX
4	DF	Sonia Walk	August 12, 2002 (aged 15)	(Canadian Soccer Association) North Toronto
5	DF	Maya Antoine	August 8, 2001 (aged 16)	(Canadian Soccer Association) Girls Elite REX
6	DF	Ariel Young	August 30, 2001 (aged 16)	(Canadian Soccer Association) Ottawa Fury
7	FW	Serita Thurton	January 16, 2002 (aged 16)	(Canadian Soccer Association) Markham
8	DF	Caitlin Shaw	July 20, 2001 (aged 16)	(Canadian Soccer Association) Girls Elite REX
9	FW	Jordyn Huitema	May 8, 2001 (aged 16)	(Canadian Soccer Association) Girls Elite REX
10	MF	Aaliyah Scott	August 23, 2001 (aged 16)	(Canadian Soccer Association) Girls Elite REX
11	FW	Kaila Novak	March 24, 2002 (aged 16)	(Canadian Soccer Association) FC London
12	FW	Teni Akindoju	July 8, 2001 (aged 16)	(Canadian Soccer Association) Girls Elite REX
13	DF	Olivia Cooke	January 12, 2001 (aged 17)	(Canadian Soccer Association) West Ottawa
14	MF	Maya Ladhani	September 6, 2002 (aged 15)	(Canadian Soccer Association) Girls Elite REX
15	MF	Wayny Balata	June 25, 2001 (aged 16)	(Canadian Soccer Association) Lakeshore
16	FW	Andersen Williams	April 2, 2002 (aged 16)	(Canadian Soccer Association) Girls Elite REX
17	MF	Stella Downing	December 6, 2002 (aged 15)	(Canadian Soccer Association) Girls Elite REX
18	GK	Sophie Guilmette	March 24, 2001 (aged 17)	(Canadian Soccer Association) Lakeshore
19	MF	Jade Rose	February 12, 2003 (aged 15)	(Canadian Soccer Association) Unionville Milliken
20	DF	Julianne Vallerand	August 9, 2001 (aged 16)	(Canadian Soccer Association) AS Varennes

=== Bermuda ===
Bermuda named their squad on 6 April 2018.

Manager: Aaron Denkins

No.	Pos.	Player	Date of birth (age)	Club
1	GK	Zakhari Turner	22 January 2003 (aged 15)	(United States Soccer Federation) Montverde
2	DF	Koa Goodchild	29 January 2003 (aged 15)	(Bermuda Football Association) Saltus Grammar
3	DF	Zemira Webb	21 July 2004 (aged 13)	(Bermuda Football Association) Warwick Academy
4	DF	Zekiah Lewis	9 January 2001 (aged 17)	(United States Soccer Federation) St. Johnsbury
5	MF	Trinae Edwards	17 February 2002 (aged 16)	(Bermuda Football Association) Cedarbridge
6	DF	Danni Watson	28 March 2003 (aged 15)	(Bermuda Football Association) Saltus Grammar
7	MF	Sh’Nyah Akinstall	23 April 2003 (aged 14)	(Bermuda Football Association) Berkeley
8	MF	Katelyn Madeiros	4 February 2005 (aged 13)	(Bermuda Football Association) Bermuda High
9	FW	Nia Christopher	2 May 2001 (aged 16)	(United States Soccer Federation) John Carroll
10	MF	Leilanni Nesbeth	17 July 2001 (aged 16)	(The Football Association) Brighton & Hove Albion
11	FW	Adia Gibbons	27 March 2003 (aged 15)	(Bermuda Football Association) Berkeley
12	GK	Gaiya Melakot	2 July 2002 (aged 15)	(Bermuda Football Association) Berkeley
13	FW	Tianna Mullan	25 December 2001 (aged 16)	(United States Soccer Federation) IMG
14	MF	Emily Cabral	1 July 2004 (aged 13)	(Bermuda Football Association) TN Tatem
15	MF	Jadae Steede Hill	1 June 2001 (aged 16)	(Bermuda Football Association) Berkeley
16	DF	Delia Ebbin	28 February 2001 (aged 17)	(United States Soccer Federation) Darlington
17	MF	Jya Ratteray Smith	14 June 2001 (aged 16)	(Bermuda Football Association) Berkeley
18	DF	Jenna Rempel	2 July 2002 (aged 15)	(United States Soccer Federation) Choate Rosemary
19	MF	Dazarre Place	9 March 2001 (aged 17)	(Bermuda Football Association) Berkeley
20	MF	Druw Bascome	18 November 2002 (aged 15)	(Bermuda Football Association) Cedarbridge
21	FW	Che Dowling	30 December 2004 (aged 13)	
