= List of Puerto Rican football champions =

This is a list of association football champions in Puerto Rico, a territory of the United States.

The sport was brought to Puerto Rico in the late nineteenth century, when sailors introduced the sport to the island. By the 1910s, organized clubs had begun to emerge, including the Ponce Association Football Club, founded in 1905 and regarded as the oldest known football club on the island. The first recorded football match took place in March 1911 between teams representing Comercio Sporting. Documented records of championship winners in Puerto Rico’s top divisions date from 1911 onward.

Despite its early introduction, football has not been the dominant sport in Puerto Rico, a pattern shared by several Caribbean nations. Organized championships began to take shape in the 1950s, and for several decades competitions were conducted on an amateur basis.

There were several amateur tournaments and leagues throughout the second half of the 20th century, but it wasn't until 1996, with the establishment of the Liga Mayor de Fútbol Nacional (Major League of National Football) that a significant institutional development occurred in Puerto Rican football, marking the beginning of a gradual process of professionalization. In 2005, the principal competition was rebranded as the Campeonato Nacional de Fútbol (National Football Championship). The transition to a fully professional structure was completed in 2008 with the creation of the Puerto Rico Soccer League.

== Torneo Nacional Superior ==
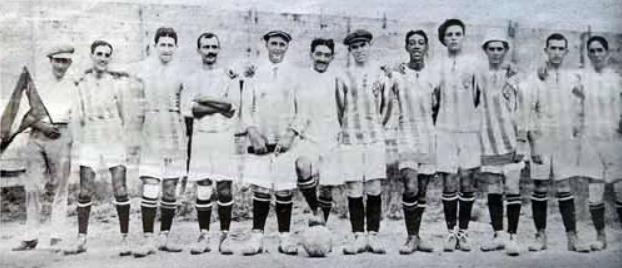
San Juan FC in 1915.

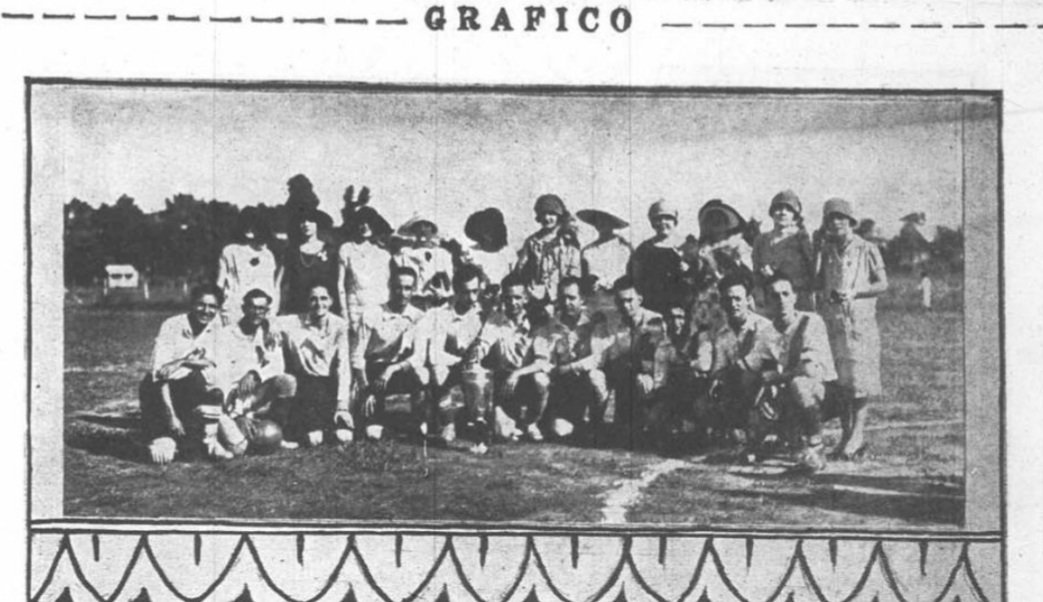
España FC (Puerto Rico) in 1927.

The Torneo Nacional Superior (TNS) (Superior National Tournament) was the first attempt at organizing the football clubs in the island. It lasted from 1911 until 1994, when a breakaway league formed, and that breakaway league would last until 2002.

Season	Champions
1911	Minerva FC (1)
1912	Not held
1913	Not held
1914	Celtics FC (1)
1915	San Juan FC (1)
1916	Not held
1917	Not held
1918	Not held
1919	Not held
1920	San Juan FC (2)
1921	España FC (1)
1922	Real San Juan FC (1)
1923	Not held
1924	Not held
1925	Not held
1926	Real San Juan FC (2)
1927	España FC (2)
1928	España FC (3)
1929	España FC (4)
1930	España FC (5)
1931	Not held
1932	Not held
1933	Not held
1934	Arecibo FC (1)
1935	Arecibo FC (2)
1936	Real San Juan FC (3)
1937	Not held
1938	Not held
1939	Not held
1940	Not held
1941	Not held
1942	Not held
1943	Not held
1944	Not held
1945	Not held
1946	America FC (1)
1947	America FC (2)
1948	America FC (3)
1949	Arqueros Verdes (1)
1950	Not held
1951	Arqueros Verdes (2)
1952	Not held
1953	Santurce FC (1)
1954	Not held
1955	Not held
1956	Caribes FC (1)
1957	Caribes FC (2)
1958	Arqueros Verdes (3)
1959	Millionarios FC (1)
1960	Suizos FC (1)
1961	Atlético de Añasco (1)
1962	Atlético de Añasco (2)
1963	Don Bosco FC (1)
1963	Deportivo Español (1)
1964	Interguayamés FC (1)
1965	Atlético de Añasco (3)
1966	Not held
1967	Roosevelt FC (1)
1968	Roosevelt FC (2)
1969	Don Bosco FC (2)
1970	Don Bosco FC (3)
1971	Guayama FC (1)
1972	Roosevelt FC (3)
1973	Roosevelt FC (4)
1974	Guayama FC (2)
1975	Academia Quintana (1)
1976	Atlético Guayamés (1)
1977	Atlético Guayamés (2)
1978	Academia Quintana (2)
1979	Remanso FC (1)
1980	YaMa Sun Oil (1)
1981	Academia Quintana (3)
1982	Guayama FC (3)
1983	Brujos de Guayama (1)
1984	Academia Quintana (4)
1985	Brujos de Guayama (2)
1986	Academia Quintana (5)
1987	Brujos de Guayama (3)
1988	Academia Quintana (6)
1989	Academia Quintana (7)
1990	Cruz Azul (Guayama) (1)
1991	Guayama FC (4)
1992	Bucaneros de Arroyo (1)
1993	Bucaneros de Arroyo (2)
1994	Don Bosco FC (4)
1994	Rafael Santiago (1)

=== Championships by team ===
Club	Titles
Academia Quintana	7
España FC	5
Don Bosco FC	4
Roosevelt FC	4
Guayama FC	4
America FC	3
Arqueros Verdes	3
Atlético de Añasco	3
Brujos de Guayama	3
Real San Juan FC	3
Arecibo FC	2
Atlético Guayamés	2
Bucaneros de Arroyo	2
Caribes FC	2
San Juan FC	2
Celtics FC	1
Cruz Azul (Guayama)	1
Deportivo Español	1
Interguayamés FC	1
Millionarios FC	1
Minerva FC	1
Rafael Santiago	1
Remanso FC	1
Santurce FC	1
Suizos FC	1
YaMa Sun Oil	1

For unknown reasons, several teams broke away and created a second league. Both of them existed from 1995 until 2005, when a united island-wide championship began to be organized.

Season	Champions
1995–96	Academia Quintana (8)
1996–97	Academia Quintana (9)
1997–98	Academia Quintana (10)
1998–99	CF Nacional (Carolina) (1)
1999–2000	Academia Quintana (11)
2000–01	Academia Quintana (12)
2001–02	Academia Quintana (13)
2002–03	Not held
2003–04	Not held
2004–05	Not held

=== Championships by team ===
Club	Titles
Academia Quintana	6
CF Nacional (Carolina)	1

== Asociación de Fútbol de Puerto Rico ==
The Asociación de Fútbol de Puerto Rico (Puerto Rico Football Association) existed for a single season (1996) with teams from San Juan, Yabucoa, Caguas, Maunabo, Guayama, Ponce, Cabo Rojo, Mayagüez, Aguadilla, and Arecibo.

== Liga Mayor de Fútbol Nacional ==
Created by teams that broke away from the TNS, the Liga Mayor de Fútbol Nacional (LMFN) (Major League of National Football) lasted for nine seasons and ran parallel to the TNS.

=== Champions by season ===
Season	Champions	Score	Runners-up	Regular season winner
1996–97	Maunabo Leones (1)	2–0	Puerto Rico Islanders	Puerto Rico Islanders
1997–98	Puerto Rico Islanders (1)	3–0	Brujos (Guayama)	Puerto Rico Islanders
1998–99	Puerto Rico Islanders (2)	4–0	Cardenales (Río Piedras)	Cardenales (Río Piedras)
1999–00	Vaqueros de Bayamón (1)	1–0	Gigantes de Carolina FC	Puerto Rico Islanders
2000–01	Puerto Rico Islanders (3)	4–3	Brujos (Guayama)	Puerto Rico Islanders
2001–02	Vaqueros de Bayamón (2)	3–0	Puerto Rico Islanders	Vaqueros de Bayamón
2002–03	Sporting (Carolina) (1)	2–1	Vaqueros de Bayamón	Sporting (Carolina)
2003–04	Sporting (San Lorenzo) (1)	1–0	Caguas Huracan	Sporting (San Lorenzo)
2004–05	Academia Quintana (14)	2–1	CF Fraigcomar	CF Fraigcomar

=== Championships by team ===
Club	Titles	Runners-up
Puerto Rico Islanders	3	2
Vaqueros de Bayamón	2	1
Maunabo Leones	1	—
Academia Quintana	1	—
Sporting (Carolina)	1	—
Sporting (San Lorenzo)	1	—
Brujos (Guayama)	—	2
Cardenales (Río Piedras)	—	1
CF Fraigcomar	—	1
Gigantes de Carolina FC	—	1
Caguas Huracan	—	1

== Campeonato Nacional de Fútbol ==
In 2005, a new island-wide championship was created by the Puerto Rican Football Federation, the Campeonato Nacional de Fútbol (National Football Championship), but it was composed mainly from teams from the LMF.

Season	Champions	Score	Runners-up
2005	CF Fraigcomar (1)	1–0	Huracán FC Caguas
2006	CF Fraigcomar (2)	4–1	Academia Quintana
2007	CF Fraigcomar (3)	2–1	Atléticos de Levittown FC

=== Championships by team ===
Club	Titles	Runners-up
CF Fraigcomar	3	—
Huracán FC Caguas	—	1
Academia Quintana FC	—	1
Atléticos de Levittown FC	—	1

== Puerto Rico Soccer League ==
In 2008, the first professional league was created, the Puerto Rico Soccer League (PRSL), which was composed of eight teams playing the regular season, and the top four seeded moving on to the playoffs. A ninth team joined in 2009, three teams joined in 2010, and one team joined for the 2011 season, after which the league folded. A new professional league, the Liga Profesional de Fútbol de Puerto Rico, was scheduled to start in 2013.

Season	Champions	Aggregate	Runners-up	1st leg	2nd leg	Regular season winner
2008^{1}	Sevilla FC Bayamón (1)	2–1	CA River Plate Ponce	--	--	Sevilla FC Bayamón (1)
2009	Bayamón FC (1)	3–2	Atlético de San Juan FC	2–2	1–0	CA River Plate Ponce (1)
2010^{2}	CA River Plate Ponce (1)	3–0	Puerto Rico Islanders FC	1–0	2–0	--
2011^{3}	FC Leones de Ponce (1)	1–1 (3–0 pen.)	Sevilla FC Juncos	--	--	Sevilla FC Juncos (2)
2012	Not held					
2013	Not held					
2014 (Super Copa Gigante)	Criollos de Caguas FC (1)	2–1	Bayamón FC			
2014 (Copa Criolla)	Criollos de Caguas FC (2)	RR	Academia Quintana			
2014 (Copa Excelencia)	Criollos de Caguas FC (3)	RR	FC Mayagüez			
2015	SPDP Spartans (1)	RR	Academia Quintana			
2016	Metropolitan FA (1)	2–2 (3–1 pen.)	Bayamón FC			
2017	GPS Puerto Rico (1)	2–1	Bayamón FC			

^{1}The 2008 championship match had only one leg.
^{2}The 2010 season was cancelled. This match was the final of the Supercopa DirecTV 2010, which served as the qualifier for the 2011 CFU Club Championship.
^{3}The 2011 championship match had only one leg. After 120 minutes, the game was decided in favor of FC Leones de Ponce, who were able to successful convert its first three penalty attempts and, also, were able to stop all three attempts from Sevilla FC Juncos.

=== Championships by team ===
Club	Titles	Runners-up
Criollos FC (Caguas)	3	—
Bayamón FC	1	3
CA River Plate Ponce	1	1
Sevilla FC Puerto Rico	1	1
FC Leones de Ponce	1	—
GPS Puerto Rico	1	—
Metropolitan FA	1	—
SPDP Spartans	1	—
Atlético de San Juan FC	—	1
Academia Quintana FC	—	2
Puerto Rico Islanders FC	—	1
FC Mayagüez	—	1

== Liga Nacional de Fútbol ==
In 2008, along with the first division, a PRSL 2nd division tournament was organized, anticipating a promotion/relegation system, which was scheduled to start in 2011, but that was postponed till 2013. In 2009, the Puerto Rican Football Federation renamed the 2nd division league as the Liga Nacional de Fútbol (National Football League) and made it a separate league. The 2008 season had eighteen teams divided in three groups; the 2009 season had sixteen teams divided in two groups; while the 2010 season had twenty-one teams divided in four groups. For the 2011 season, the LNFPR split into a first division with eight teams and a second division with 14 teams, retaking the promotion/relegation ideas, which is to start in 2013.

Season	Champions	Score	Runners-up
2008	San Juan Sharks (1)	4–1	Maunabo Leones FC
2009	Maunabo Leones FC (2)	2–1	Bayamón FC
2010	Maunabo Leones FC (3)	2–0	Bayamón FC
2011	Bayamón FC (2)	RR	Sevilla FC Puerto Rico
2012	Bayamón FC (3)	RR	Sevilla FC Puerto Rico
2013	Sevilla FC Puerto Rico (2)	6–0	Bayamón FC
2014	Yabuco Sual FC (1)	2–2 (8–7 pen.)	Guayama FC
2015	Criollos de Caguas FC (4)	4–2	Guayama FC
2016^{1}	Puerto Rico FC (1)	4–1	Criollos de Caguas FC
2017–18	Not held		

^{1}The 2016 season was cancelled. This match was the final of the 2016 Copa Luis Villarejo, which served as the qualifier for the 2017 CFU Club Championship.

=== Championships by team ===
Club	Titles	Runners-up
Bayamón FC	2	3
Maunabo Leones FC	2	1
Sevilla FC Puerto Rico	1	2
Criollos de Caguas FC	1	1
Puerto Rico FC	1	—
San Juan Sharks	1	—
Yabuco Sual FC	1	—
Guayama FC	—	2

== Liga Puerto Rico and Liga Puerto Rico Pro ==
In August 2018, a new league called Liga Puerto Rico was announced by the Puerto Rican Football Federation. Prior to the announcement, the federation organized a preparatory tournament that ran from March until June 2018. Ten teams participated in the tournament which was eventually won by Bayamón FC. The league's official launch event attended by FIFA and CONCACAF delegates was held on August 23, 2018 with the league set to begin play the following month. The league began play on September 29, 2018.

In 2025, the league was renamed as the Liga Puerto Rico Pro by the Puerto Rican Football Federation.

Season	Champions	Runners-up	Ref.
2018–19	Metropolitan FA (2)	Bayamon FC	
2019–20	Canceled due to the COVID-19 pandemic in Puerto Rico		
2020–21	Canceled due to the COVID-19 pandemic in Puerto Rico		
2021	Bayamon FC (4)	Metropolitan FA	
2022	Metropolitan FA (3)	Puerto Rico Sol	
2022 Apertura	Metropolitan FA (4)	Puerto Rico Sol	
2023 Clausura	Metropolitan FA (5)	Academia Quintana	
2023 Apertura	Academia Quintana (15)	Metropolitan FA	
2024 Clausura	Academia Quintana (16)	Metropolitan FA	
2024 Apertura	Academia Quintana (17)	Metropolitan FA	
2025 Clausura	Metropolitan FA (6)	Academia Quintana	
2025 Apertura	Academia Quintana (18)	Puerto Rico Surf SC	
2026 Clausura	Ponce FC (1)	Academia Quintana	

=== Championships by team ===
Club	Titles	Runners-up
Metropolitan FA	5	4
Academia Quintana	4	3
Ponce FC	1	—
Bayamón FC	1	1
Puerto Rico Sol	—	2
Puerto Rico Surf SC	—	1

== See also ==
- Puerto Rican Football Federation
- Football in Puerto Rico
