= 2015 Liga Nacional de Fútbol de Puerto Rico =

Liga Nacional de Fútbol de Puerto Rico
- Season: 2015
- Champions: Criollos de Caguas FC
- Matches: 60
- Goals: 129 (2.15 per match)

The 2015 Liga Nacional de Fútbol de Puerto Rico is 7th season Puerto Rico's top-division football league.

== Teams ==
| Club | Home city | Stadium |
|---|---|---|
| Bayamon FC | Bayamon | Juan Ramon Loubriel Stadium |
| Criollos de Caguas FC | Caguas | Polideportivo Villa del Rey 1era |
| Guayama FC | Guayama | Parque Roberto Monroig |
| Leones de Maunabo | Maunabo | |
| Yabuco FC | Yabucoa | Pista Atlética Adán Fonseca |
| Tornados de Humacao | Humacao | Nestor Morales Stadium |

== Standings ==
| Pos | Team | Pld | W | D | L | GF | GA | GD | Pts |
|---|---|---|---|---|---|---|---|---|---|
| 1 | Criollos de Caguas FC | 10 | 7 | 2 | 1 | 33 | 9 | +24 | 23 |
| 2 | Guayama FC | 10 | 5 | 3 | 2 | 29 | 15 | +14 | 18 |
| 3 | Bayamón FC | 10 | 5 | 3 | 2 | 19 | 10 | +9 | 18 |
| 4 | Leones de Maunabo | 10 | 4 | 3 | 3 | 28 | 18 | +10 | 15 |
| 5 | Yabuco FC | 10 | 3 | 1 | 6 | 15 | 29 | −14 | 10 |
| 6 | Tornados de Humacao | 10 | 0 | 0 | 10 | 5 | 48 | −43 | 0 |

Source: FIFA.com and TNT Sports
Rules for classification: 1) points; 2) goal difference; 3) number of goals scored.

== Playoffs ==
Semifinals
1 | Criollos de Caguas FC | 3 | 0 | 3
4 | Leones de Maunabo | 2 | 0 | 2
2 | Guayama FC | 3 | 0 | 3
3 | Bayamon FC | 0 | 0 | 0

Finals
1 | Criollos de Caguas FC | 4 | 4
2 | Guayama FC | 2 | 2

== LNF Championship Game ==
=== Match-day 1 ===
December 19th, 2015
PM

| Criollos de Caguas FC | 4 – 2 | Guayama FC |
|---|---|---|
| . | Report | . |

Juan Ramon Loubriel Stadium
