= Jorge Ramírez (footballer, born 1975) =

Peruvian footballer (born 1975)

Personal information
- Full name: Jorge Eduardo Ramírez Tabacchi
- Date of birth: 7 September 1975 (age 51)
- Place of birth: Lima, Peru
- Height: 1.78 m (5 ft 10 in)
- Position: Forward

Senior career*
Years	Team	Apps	(Gls)
1993–1997	Alianza Lima		
1994	→ América Cochahuayco (loan)		
1997	Tampico Madero	0	(0)
1997	Sporting Cristal	9	(1)
1998	Skoda Xanthi	7	(0)
1998	Alianza Lima	9	(0)
1999	Unión Minas	21	(2)
1999–2000	Alianza Atlético	57	(10)
2001	Deportivo Wanka	44	(22)
2002	Espérance Sportive de Tunis		
2002–2004	Coronel Bolognesi	81	(15)
2005	Sporting Cristal	9	(0)
2005	FBC Melgar	19	(3)
2006	Olympiakos Nicosia	2	(0)
2006	José Gálvez FBC	13	(0)
2007	Puerto Rico Islanders	3	(1)
2014	Isabela SC		

International career
1996	Peru Olympic		
1996–2001	Peru	3	(0)
- * Club domestic league appearances and goals

Jorge Eduardo Ramírez Tabacchi (born September 7, 1975) is a Peruvian former footballer who played as forward.

== Playing career ==
=== Club career ===
A rising star of Peruvian football, Jorge Ramírez (nicknamed Loverita) made his debut for Alianza Lima in 1993. He scored 15 goals between 1995 and 1996 but then suffered a long career slump. He would never score again for Alianza Lima, a club he nevertheless returned to in 1998. In the interim, he played abroad for Tampico Madero (Mexico) in 1997 and then for Skoda Xanthi (Greece) the following year.

Back in Peru, after some less-than-successful spells at Sporting Cristal, Unión Minas, and Alianza Atlético between 1997 and 2000, he returned to prominence with Deportivo Wanka, where he became the top scorer in the 2001 Peruvian league with 21 goals.

He moved abroad for a third time, this time to Tunisia with Espérance Sportive de Tunis (champions in 2002). Quickly returning to Peru, he joined Coronel Bolognesi between 2002 and 2004, where he had the opportunity to play under Jorge Sampaoli.

After a stint in 2005 with Sporting Cristal, he had his fourth experience abroad when he signed with Olympiakos Nicosia (Cyprus) in 2006. He finished his career in Puerto Rico (Puerto Rico Islanders in 2007, and seven years later, with Isabela SC, where he definitively ended his playing career).

=== International career ===
Jorge Ramírez participated with the Peruvian Olympic team in the 1996 CONMEBOL Pre-Olympic Tournament. Having become an international player, he had three caps (no goals scored) for the Peruvian national team between 1996 and 2001.

== Personal life ==
After retiring from professional football, Ramírez worked as a youth manager in Puerto Rico.

== Honours ==
Espérance Sportive de Tunis

- Tunisian Ligue Professionnelle 1: 2001–02

Deportivo Wanka

- Torneo Descentralizado Top scorer: 2001 (21 goals)
