= 2001 Sporting Cristal season =

Sporting Cristal
2001 season
- Stadium: San Martín de Porres, Lima
- Torneo Descentralizado: Torneo Apertura: First (1°) Play-off (lost); Torneo Clausura: Third (3°); Aggregate Table: First (1°); Third Play-offs: Third (winner); Third National (3°)
Home colours	Away colours	Third colours

The 2001 Sporting Cristal season were the Forty-Sixth (46.º) of the club from its foundation in 1955, Forty-Six (46) participations consecutives in the top-flight of Peruvian Primera División (of 85 Editions) with denomination Torneo Descentralizado. In Previous Season the club qualified as Runner-up National 2nd Place of the 2000 Torneo Descentralizado.

Sporting Cristal were a of twelve (12) clubs in the Thirty-Sixth edition (36.º) Torneo Descentralizado, the competition most important of the Peruvian football. The club played the Peruvian Primera División, Copa Merconorte for Fourth (4th) Time and Copa Libertadores for Twenty-First (21st) Time.

== Torneo Descentralizado ==
=== Torneo Apertura ===
Pos	Team	Pld	W	D	L	GF	GA	GD	Pts
1	Sporting Cristal	22	13	7	2	46	18	+28	46
2	Alianza Lima	22	12	7	2	42	19	+22	46
3	FBC Melgar	22	10	5	7	45	30	+15	35

== See also ==
- Club Sporting Cristal
- 2001 Torneo Descentralizado
