= Huracan (disambiguation) =

Huracan is the hurricane god of Maya mythology. In modern Spanish, huracán means hurricane.

Huracán may also refer to:

- ARM Huracán, a Mexican Navy missile boat
- Huracan (Belantis), a Gerstlauer Euro-Fighter model roller coaster at Belantis amusement park
- Huracán (telenovela), a Mexican telenovela
- Lamborghini Huracán, an automobile produced by Lamborghini
- El Huracan, album by Steve Jordan (accordionist)
- Huracan, an extinct genus of bears

== Sports ==
- Club Atlético Huracán, Argentine football club
- Huracán Buceo, Uruguayan football club
- Huracán de Comodoro Rivadavia, Argentine football club
- Huracán Corrientes, Argentine football club
- Huracán de San Rafael, Argentine football club
- Huracán de Tres Arroyos, Argentine football club
- Huracán Ramírez a famous Mexican luchador
- Huracán Valencia Club de Fútbol, Spanish football club
- Huracán de Medellin, Colombian football club
- Huracán FC, Puerto Rican football club
- Huracán F.C., Uruguayan football club
- Huracán Valencia CF, Spanish football club
- AD Huracán, Spanish football club
- CD Huracán Z, Spanish football club
