= Pachuca Puerto Rico =

- Full name: Pachuca Puerto Rico
- Founded: 2009
- Ground: Nestor Morales Stadium; Humacao, Puerto Rico
- Chairman: (Puerto Rico) Evaristo Pérez
- Manager: (Mexico) Eloy Ubaldo Martínez Soto
- League: Puerto Rico Soccer League
- 2009: in progress
- Website: http://www.tornadosdehumacao.com/initial.htm
Home colours	Away colours

Pachuca Puerto Rico is a soccer team that was renamed from Tornados de Humacao for the 2009 season in the Puerto Rico Soccer League. The team plays in Humacao, Puerto Rico. It is affiliated with C.F. Pachuca of Mexico hints the name Pachuca Puerto Rico.

== History ==
There is currently no history being that this is their first year. Tornados de Humacao has history.

=== Puerto Rico Soccer League ===
2009 Season

== Current squad ==
Note: Flags indicate national team as defined under FIFA eligibility rules; some limited exceptions apply. Players may hold more than one non-FIFA nationality.

No.	Pos.	Nation	Player
1	GK	PUR	Elimagdiel Amaro
2	MF	PUR	Gustavo Flores
4	MF	PUR	Fernando Gonzalez
5	MF	PUR	Jose M. Jimenez
6	MF	PUR	Javier Jimenez
7	DF	PUR	Israel Velazquez
17	FW	MEX	Argenis Soria
9	FW	PUR	Luis Diaz
10	MF	ARG	Jonathan Genero
11	MF	PUR	Jose Juan Perez

No.	Pos.	Nation	Player
12	MF	PUR	Juan Alvarado
13	DF	PUR	Santos Molina
14	DF	PUR	Melvin Santiago
15	MF	PUR	Christian Hernandez
16	DF	PUR	Fabian Arce
17	MF	PUR	Juan Marcano
18	MF	PUR	Leonardo Rodriguez
19	DF	PUR	Michael Marcano
20	DF	PUR	Luis Caballero
21	MF	MEX	Yeshua Soria
22	FW	MEX	Jose Enrrique Perez
