= Bleachers (disambiguation) =

Bleachers are raised, tiered rows of benches.

Bleachers may also refer to:

- Bleachers (band), an American indie pop band started by Jack Antonoff
  - Bleachers (album), 2024 album by Bleachers
- Bleachers (novel), a 2003 novel by John Grisham
- Bleach wash jeans, worn as part of early 1980s skinhead and punk fashion
