= EFBR =

Puerto Rican soccer team

- Full name: Escuela de Fútbol Beca Ramos
- Nickname: Bazuras
- Founded: 2009
- Ground: Caguas, Puerto Rico
- Capacity: -30
- Chairman: Gerardo Silva
- Manager: Daniel "Beca" Ramos
- League: Liga Nacional
- 2009: Last position
- Website: http://www.lnfpr.com/equipos/gladiadores-efbr/

Escuela de Fútbol Beca Ramos, known as EFBR and also called Gladiadores, is a Puerto Rican soccer team that plays in Caguas. They play in the Liga Nacional.

== Liga Nacional ==
Lost their first game 6-1 to Criollos de Caguas FC.

== Current squad ==
Note: Flags indicate national team as defined under FIFA eligibility rules; some limited exceptions apply. Players may hold more than one non-FIFA nationality.

No.	Pos.	Nation	Player
—	GK	PUR	Raúl Rodríguez
—	DF	PUR	Joshua Valentín
—	DF	PUR	Javier Rodríguez
—	DF	PUR	Arnaldo Cabrera
—	DF	PUR	Andrés Cabrera
—	DF	PUR	Gerardo Silva
—	DF	PUR	Gustavo Stuart
—	DF	PUR	Jan S. Rodríguez
—	DF	PUR	Ángel Ortíz

No.	Pos.	Nation	Player
—	DF	PUR	Alonzo Villarini Disdier
—	DF	PUR	Emil Lucca
—	DF	PUR	Jesus L. Reyes
—	DF	PUR	José G. Reyes
—	DF	PUR	Hommy Rivera
—	DF	PUR	Christopher Mercado
—	DF	PUR	Carlos Villarini Disdier
—	DF	PUR	Daniel Ramos
—	FW	PUR	Charlie Villegas
