= Arnold Hollis =

Archdeacon of Bermuda

The Ven. Dr. Arnold Thaddeus Hollis
- Archdeacon Emeritus of Bermuda
- Church: Anglican Church of Bermuda
- Diocese: Bermuda
- Appointed: 1997
- Term ended: 2004
- Previous posts: Rector, St. James’s Church, Sandys (1977–2020)

Orders
- Ordination: 1950s

Personal details
- Born: 9 July 1933 Bermuda
- Died: January 2026 (aged 92)
- Denomination: Anglican
- Occupation: Priest
- Education: Codrington College; various institutions (BA, MDiv ×2, D.Min)

The Ven. Dr. Arnold Thaddeus Hollis (1933-2026) was a Bermudian Anglican priest who served as Archdeacon of Bermuda from 1997 to 2004 and later as rector of St. James’s Anglican Church in Sandys for more than four decades. After an early calling to ministry and theological training in Barbados and England, he spent many years serving abroad before returning to Bermuda, where he became a prominent figure in the Anglican Church. Hollis was also known for his theological teaching and public lectures on Christian mission and church life, and held the title of Archdeacon Emeritus.

== Biography ==
Hollis developed an early interest in church life and felt called to ministry as a child. After graduating from the Berkeley Institute, he worked as a teacher but continued to pursue ordained ministry. With the support of local clergy, he was accepted into Codrington Theological College in Barbados in 1956, later completing further training and his curacy in England.

Unable to obtain a position in Bermuda at that time, Hollis spent many years serving abroad. He worked in Guyana, where he ministered both to Amerindian communities in the jungle and to people with leprosy, and later held parish positions in England and the United States. During this period, he earned a bachelor’s degree in sociology, two Master of Divinity degrees, and a doctorate in parish ministry and church administration.

Despite repeated rejections from Bermudian parishes - first for being "not qualified" and later for being "too qualified" - Hollis continued to apply. In 1977, following intervention by Minister of Immigration John Swan, he was appointed rector of St. James’s Church in Sandys, where he served until his retirement in 2020 after 43 years. He was nominated for Bishop of Bermuda three times and served as Archdeacon of Bermuda from 1997 to 2004. He also acted as chaplain to the former Casemates Prison and to the Royal Navy.

Hollis retired at age 87 and remained active with his family and community. He died in January 2026.

== Theological work ==
In addition to his parish work, Hollis authored a theological paper titled Where the Spirit Leads, developed from the Anglican Church of Bermuda’s 2009 vision statement Where the Lord Leads. He later presented a four-week public lecture series at St. James’s Anglican Church focused on Christian mission, church reform, and the role of believers in contemporary society. The programme was open to clergy and laypeople from across denominations, reflecting Hollis’s emphasis on inter-church cooperation and speaking "the truth in love".

Church of England titles
Preceded by Ewen Ratteray	Archdeacon of Bermuda	Succeeded by Andrew William Doughty
