= Alex Scott (politician) =

Premier of Bermuda (2003–2006)

The Honourable William Alexander Scott
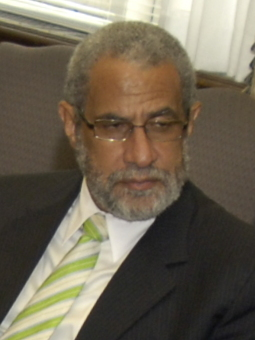

8th Premier of Bermuda
- In office 29 July 2003 – October 30, 2006
- Monarch: Elizabeth II
- Governor: John Vereker
- Preceded by: Jennifer M. Smith
- Succeeded by: Ewart Brown
- Constituency: Warwick South East (House of Assembly)

Personal details
- Born: 1940 (age 85–86) Bermuda
- Party: Progressive Labour Party

William Alexander Scott (born 1940) is a politician in Bermuda who is the MP for the Warwick South East constituency. Between 2003 and 2006 he served as the Premier of Bermuda and leader of the Progressive Labour Party (PLP).

== Early life ==
The son of Willard Scott and Edith Lucille Scott of Khyber Pass, Warwick, Scott grew up in Warwick and attended Purvis Primary School, Berkeley Institute and Temple University in Philadelphia, where he obtained a Bachelor of Fine Arts Degree. He subsequently worked a graphic designer and a design consultant and ran Scotts Crafts Limited, an advertising and public relations firm he started in 1964.

== Political career ==
Scott's political career began in 1985 when he was appointed to the Senate; in 1989, he was promoted to Opposition Leader in the Senate. In 1993 he successfully ran for Parliament for the Warwick East constituency. In 1998, during the PLP's unprecedented win in Parliament, he was appointed to Cabinet as the Minister of Works & Engineering. Perhaps the most memorable event of his term was the construction of a new high school campus for the Berkeley Institute, a project with suffered significant overruns, contracting irregularities and work delays.

He was appointed Premier (and, thus, leader of the PLP) on 29 July 2003. The party had been re-elected in that year's parliamentary elections, but its leader, Dame Jennifer Meredith Smith, was overthrown hours after the election results were certified when a schism in the elected members of the party surfaced. With the two sides split 13 members each, Smith agreed to step aside with Scott as the compromise leader.

The hallmarks of his premiership were the promotion of a Social Agenda and the launch of an unpopular drive for Independence from the United Kingdom. Supporters believed he wished to spread Bermuda's wealth among the population, while critics charged that the Scott administration was racially divisive, autocratic, and lacked accountability.

Scott was never successful in unifying the factions in the party and he was ousted, by a vote of 107-76, in a leadership challenge by his Deputy Premier, Dr. Ewart Brown, during a PLP delegates conference on 27 October 2006.

He was appointed Commander of the Order of the British Empire (CBE) in the 2013 Birthday Honours for services to Bermuda.
