= Brazilian Soccer Academy =

Puerto Rican soccer team

- Full name: Brazilian Soccer Academy
- Nicknames: Brazilian SA, BSA
- Founded: 2014
- Ground: El Polideportivo de Arecibo; Arecibo, Puerto Rico
- Chairman: Charles Gatinho
- League: Liga Nacional de Fútbol de Puerto Rico
- 2014: 3rd
Home colours

Brazilian Soccer Academy is a football team based in Arecibo, Puerto Rico. The club plays in the Liga Nacional de Fútbol de Puerto Rico, the premier football division of Puerto Rico. The team is sponsored by a youth soccer academy of the same name.

== History ==
The team first joined the Liga Nacional de Fútbol de Puerto Rico in 2014, finishing third in the regular season. In the end-of-season playoffs, they defeated Puerto Rico United in the quarterfinals before falling to eventual champion Yabuco SUAL in the semifinals.

== Colors and Name ==
The team's colors are blue, green, white, and yellow, the same colors used by the Brazil national football team.
