= Andrew Doughty (priest) =

The Ven. Andrew William Doughty, BD, AKC (born 1956) is an Anglican priest; he is the current Archdeacon of Bermuda.

He was educated at King's College London and Westcott House, Cambridge; and ordained in 1983. After a curacy in Alton he held incumbencies in Basingstoke, North Baddesley and Warwick Parish, Bermuda before his appointment as Archdeacon.

Church of England titles
Preceded by Arnold Thaddeus Hollis	Archdeacon of Bermuda; 2004–	Succeeded by Current incumbent
