= 2016 Liga Nacional de Fútbol de Puerto Rico =

Liga Nacional de Fútbol de Puerto Rico
- Season: 2016
- Champions: Puerto Rico FC
- CFU Championships: Copa Luis Villarejo
- Matches played: 1
- Goals scored: 0 (0 per match)
- Top goalscorer: N/A
- Biggest home win: N/A
- Biggest away win: N/A
- Highest scoring: N/A
- Longest winning run: N/A
- Longest unbeaten run: N/A
- Longest winless run: N/A
- Longest losing run: N/A
- Highest attendance: N/A
- Lowest attendance: N/A
- Average attendance: N/A

The 2016 Liga Nacional de Fútbol de Puerto Rico would have been the 8th season of Puerto Rico's top-division football league.

The 2016 season was cancelled. The final of the 2016 Copa Luis Villarejo served as the qualifier for the 2017 CFU Club Championship.
