= Bleachers (novel) =

2003 novel by John Grisham

- First edition cover
- Author: John Grisham
- Language: English
- Genre: Novel
- Publisher: Doubleday
- Publication date: September 9, 2003
- Publication place: United States
- Media type: Print (Hardcover, Paperback)
- ISBN: 0-385-51161-2
- OCLC: 52644759
- Dewey Decimal: 813/.54 22
- LC Class: PS3557.R5355 B58 2003

Bleachers is a sports novel by John Grisham, first published on September 9, 2003. The hardcover edition was published by Doubleday and the paperback edition by Dell. The book focuses on whether the famous Eddie Rake, former coach of the Messina High School football team, was loved or hated by his former players.

== Plot summary ==
Neely Crenshaw, born in 1970, is a high school All-American quarterback, who has been Messina High School's 'golden boy,' expected to lead them to the state title.

Neely was a highly recruited quarterback known for his throwing ability, mobility, and physical stature. He was regarded by some as one of the greatest quarterbacks in Messina's history. According to the account, when Neely was younger and playing football with friends, a spectator approached him and predicted, "You're going to play football for the Spartans."

In 1987, after trailing 31–0 at halftime to East Pike, and crippled by a broken hand, the gutsy quarterback rallies the Spartans to a 34–31 victory for Messina's first state championship in seven years, achieved without the assistance of coach Rake. His hand injury is caused when Neely punches Coach Eddie Rake in the face, after Coach Rake backhands him, causing him to break his nose.

After graduation, Crenshaw had received 31 scholarship offers and chooses Tech, a fictional university. He receives $50,000, a violation of NCAA rules for signing with the school.

In the second half of the 1989 Gator Bowl, Crenshaw comes off the bench for Tech, throws for three touchdowns, runs for one hundred yards and leads a last-second comeback.

As a sophomore, he is national player of the week when he throws for six touchdowns against Purdue University. But against A&M later that year, he suffers a career-ending knee injury on a cheap shot hit after Crenshaw was out of bounds.

Crenshaw subsequently drops football for the real estate business.

When the story begins, most of the 714 football players Rake had coached in his 34 years at Messina High School return to the town for the funeral of the legendary coach, a man both beloved and reviled.

Rake ends his career with 418 wins, 62 losses, and 13 state championships. During a grueling unsanctioned Sunday morning practice in 1992, Messina player Scotty Reardon died of a heat stroke. Rake's brutal training methods are called into question and the superintendent of education, who also is Reardon's uncle, fires Rake.

In a letter revealed at Rake's funeral, the coach states the two regrets of his life were losing Scotty Reardon and for striking All-American quarterback Neely Crenshaw at halftime of the 1987 championship game against East Pike.

At the funeral while giving the eulogy, Neely ends up forgiving coach after all those years of debating whether he likes or dislikes Eddie Rake.
