= Huracán FC =

Puerto Rican soccer team

- Full name: Huracán FC
- Ground: Manatí, Puerto Rico
- League: Liga Nacional

Huracán FC is a Puerto Rican soccer team in Manati, who play in the Liga Nacional.

== Liga Nacional ==
Huracán FC drew Aguadilla Spartans FC 3–3 in their first game.

== Current squad ==
Note: Flags indicate national team as defined under FIFA eligibility rules; some limited exceptions apply. Players may hold more than one non-FIFA nationality.

| No. / Pos. / Nation / Player | No. / Pos. / Nation / Player |
