= Club Yagüez =

Puerto Rican soccer team

Club Yaguez
- Full name: Club Yaguez
- Stadium: Mayaguez, Puerto Rico
- League: Liga Nacional

Club Yaguez was a Puerto Rican soccer team that plays in Mayaguez. They play in the Liga Nacional.

== Liga Nacional ==
Won their first game 6-3 to Guayanilla Pumas.

== Current squad ==
Note: Flags indicate national team as defined under FIFA eligibility rules; some limited exceptions apply. Players may hold more than one non-FIFA nationality.

No. / Pos. / Nation / Player; — / FW / PUR / Alexander Correa	No. / Pos. / Nation / Player; — / / PUR / Luis Ruiz
