= Club Deportivo Gallitos =

Puerto Rican soccer team

CD Gallitos
- Full name: Club Deportivo Gallitos
- Nickname(s): Gallitos UPR
- Stadium: Rio Piedras, Puerto Rico
- Chairman: (Puerto Rico) Artemio Lopez
- Manager: (Puerto Rico) Francisco Ortiz
- League: Liga Nacional

Club Deportivo Gallitos is a Puerto Rican soccer team which plays in Rio Piedras. The team plays in the 2nd Division of the Puerto Rico Soccer League. They also play in the Liga Nacional.

== 2008 season ==
The team finished the season with a record of 5-2-1.

== Liga Nacional ==
In the team's first game they defeated San Juan United 4-0.

== Current squad ==
Note: Flags indicate national team as defined under FIFA eligibility rules; some limited exceptions apply. Players may hold more than one non-FIFA nationality.

No.	Pos.	Nation	Player
1	GK	(Puerto Rico) PUR	Carlos J. Parlade
2	DF	(Puerto Rico) PUR	Joshua Ortiz Torruellas
3	DF	(Puerto Rico) PUR	Ramón Velasco Rivera
4	DF	(Peru) PER	José G. Reyes Tuman
5	MF	(Puerto Rico) PUR	Andrés E. Calvo Díaz
6	DF	(Puerto Rico) PUR	Ángel M. Álvarez Pereira
7	MF	(Puerto Rico) PUR	Félix Escalera Ayala
8	MF	(Puerto Rico) PUR	Jorge Figueroa
9	FW	(Dominican Republic) DOM	Richard de La Rosa
10	MF	(Puerto Rico) PUR	Raúl Rosales Córdova
11	FW	(Puerto Rico) PUR	Alfredo González
12	FW	(Catalonia) CAT	José Miguel Pérez Torres
13	DF	(Venezuela) VEN	Eduardo E. Hernández

No.	Pos.	Nation	Player
14	FW	(Puerto Rico) PUR	Néstor Hernández Lucena
15	DF	(Puerto Rico) PUR	Jorge Padial Doble
16	MF	(Puerto Rico) PUR	Jesús L. Reyes Morales
17	MF	(Puerto Rico) PUR	José Gil Santaella Colón
18	MF	(Puerto Rico) PUR	Cristian Laracuente
19	DF	(Mozambique) MOZ	Pedro Sálamo González
20	MF	(Puerto Rico) PUR	Javier Colón Martínez
22	DF	(Puerto Rico) PUR	Joshua Eick Ortiz
23	FW	(Ecuador) ECU	Pablo Vergara Jara
24	DF	(Dominican Republic) DOM	Orlando de La Rosa
25	GK	(Puerto Rico) PUR	Julio Oscar Rivera Abreu
