= Michael Fernández =

Puerto Rican footballer

Personal information
- Full name: Michael Adolfo Fernández
- Date of birth: 9 February 1994 (age 32)
- Place of birth: San Juan, Puerto Rico
- Height: 1.76 m (5 ft 9 in)
- Position: Midfielder

Youth career
- 2012–2015: Universitarios FC San Juan

Senior career*
Years	Team	Apps	(Gls)
2015–2016	Criollos de Caguas		

International career
2012	Puerto Rico U19		
2013–2014	Puerto Rico U20	5	(0)
2014–2016	Puerto Rico	7	(0)
- * Club domestic league appearances and goals as of 18 January 2017

Michael Adolfo Fernández (born 9 February 1994, in San Juan) is a Puerto Rican retired footballer who played as a midfielder for Criollos de Caguas and he also played with Puerto Rican national team.
