= Guayanilla Pumas =

Puerto Rican soccer team

- Full name: Guayanilla Pumas FC
- Stadium: Guayanilla, Puerto Rico
- Chairman: Ricardo Montes
- Manager: Lawrence Garcia; Pedro Blasini
- League: Liga Nacional

Pumas FC. is a Puerto Rican soccer team who plays in Guayanilla. The team plays in the Puerto Rico Soccer League 2nd Division. They also play in the Liga Nacional.

== 2008 season ==
The team finished the season with a record of 6–1–1. Their only loss was a 3–1 defeat to Yabucoa Borikén.

== Liga Nacional ==
The team lost their first game 6–3 to Club Yaguez.

== Current squad ==
Note: Flags indicate national team as defined under FIFA eligibility rules; some limited exceptions apply. Players may hold more than one non-FIFA nationality.

No.	Pos.	Nation	Player
1	GK	PUR	Héctor "Jun" Chacón
16	MF	PUR	Hans Pagan
77	DF	MEX	José 'Pepe" Penilla
—	DF	PUR	Juan C. Rivera
—	DF	PUR	Efraín Soto
—	DF	PUR	Javier "Japo" Santiago
—	DF	PUR	Ángel Luna
—	DF	PUR	Ángel Rivera
—	DF	PUR	Jesús Rodríguez
—	DF	PUR	José Hernandez Mejia
—	MF	PUR	Joseph Rivera

No.	Pos.	Nation	Player
—	MF	PUR	José F. Sinigaglia
—	MF	PUR	Ronald Sinigaglia
—	MF	PUR	Heriberto Galarza
—	MF	PUR	Christian Abreu
—	MF	PUR	Jean Santiago
—	MF	PUR	Juan Abreu
—	MF		Mario Armenta
—	MF	PUR	Wilmer Meletiche
—	FW	PUR	Alberto Figueroa
—	FW	PUR	Luis Lebrón Rodriguez
—	FW	PUR	Ángel Miranda
