= High Performance FC =

Association football club

- Full name: High Performance FC
- Stadium: San Juan, Puerto Rico
- League: Liga Nacional

High Performance FC is a Puerto Rican soccer team that plays in San Juan. They play in the Liga Nacional.

== Liga Nacional ==
Lost their first game 5-2 to Bayamon FC.

== Current squad ==
Note: Flags indicate national team as defined under FIFA eligibility rules; some limited exceptions apply. Players may hold more than one non-FIFA nationality.

No.	Pos.	Nation	Player
—	MF	(Puerto Rico) PUR	Gerardo Sánchez
—	FW	(Puerto Rico) PUR	Andrés Tirado

No.	Pos.	Nation	Player
—		(Puerto Rico) PUR	Álvaro Betancourt
