= 2001 Torneo Descentralizado =

Torneo Descentralizado
- Season: 2001
- Dates: 17 February 2001 – 29 December 2001
- Champions: Alianza Lima; 19th Primera División title
- Runner up: Cienciano
- Relegated: Unión Minas
- Copa Libertadores: Alianza Lima; Cienciano; Sporting Cristal
- Top goalscorer: Jorge Ramírez (21 goals)

The 2001 Torneo Descentralizado was the 85th season of the top category of Peruvian football (soccer). It was played by 12 teams. The national champion was Alianza Lima.

== Competition format ==
The national championship was divided into two half-year tournaments, the Torneo Apertura and the Torneo Clausura. Each was played on a home-and-away round-robin basis. The winners of each tournament played for the national title in a two-legged final. If the same team won both tournaments, they would be automatic champions.

Qualification to CONMEBOL's Copa Libertadores was won by each tournament winner and the winner of a play-off between the teams that placed second in each tournament. The bottom team on the aggregate table was relegated, while the eleventh-placed team played a relegation/promotion play-off against the winner of the Segunda División (Second Division).

== Teams ==
=== Team changes ===
Promoted from 2000 Copa Perú	Relegated from 2000 Primera División
▲ Estudiantes de Medicina (1st)	▼ Deportivo Municipal (12th)

=== Stadia locations ===
Locations of the 2001 Primera División teams

Team	City	Stadium	Capacity
Alianza Atlético	Sullana	Campeones del 36	8,000
Alianza Lima	Lima	Alejandro Villanueva	35,000
Cienciano	Cuzco	Garcilaso	42,056
Deportivo Wanka	Huancayo	Huancayo	20,000
Estudiantes de Medicina	Ica	José Picasso Peratta	8,000
Juan Aurich	Chiclayo	Elías Aguirre	24,500
Melgar	Arequipa	Mariano Melgar	20,000
Sport Boys	Callao	Miguel Grau	15,000
Sport Coopsol Trujillo	Trujillo	Mansiche	24,000
Sporting Cristal	Lima	San Martín de Porres	18,000
Unión Minas	Cerro de Pasco	Daniel Alcides Carrión	8,000
Universitario	Lima	Monumental	80,093

== Torneo Apertura ==
=== Standings ===
Pos	Team	Pld	W	D	L	GF	GA	GD	Pts	Qualification
1	Sporting Cristal (A)	22	13	7	2	46	18	+28	46	2002 Copa Libertadores play-off
2	Alianza Lima (A, O)	22	13	7	2	42	19	+23	46	Copa Libertadores 2002 First stage
3	Melgar	22	10	5	7	45	30	+15	35	
4	Cienciano	22	11	2	9	43	28	+15	35	
5	Sport Boys	22	9	4	9	36	40	−4	31	
6	Juan Aurich	22	9	4	9	24	39	−15	31	
7	Alianza Atlético	22	9	3	10	24	39	−15	30	
8	Universitario	22	8	5	9	29	30	−1	29	
9	Sport Coopsol Trujillo	22	7	4	11	38	48	−10	25	
10	Unión Minas	22	7	2	13	30	39	−9	23	
11	Estudiantes de Medicina	22	5	5	12	25	53	−28	20	
12	Deportivo Wanka	22	4	6	12	27	36	−9	18	

Updated to match(es) played on July 2001. Source: https://www.rsssf.org/tablesp/peru01.html
Rules for classification: 1) points; 2) goal difference; 3) number of goals scored.
(A) Advance to a further round; (O) Play-off winners

=== Results ===
Home \ Away	AAS	ALI	CIE	WAN	EST	MEL	JA	SBA	COO	CRI	MIN	UNI
Alianza Atlético		2–2	2–0	3–1	1–0	2–1	2–1	1–0	2–1	1–1	2–1	0–1
Alianza Lima	4–0		3–1	4–0	3–0	1–0	3–0	3–1	1–0	2–1	2–0	1–0
Cienciano	2–0	1–0		4–2	4–1	1–2	5–2	6–0	5–0	1–1	3–0	0–0
Deportivo Wanka	4–1	1–1	1–2		0–1	1–1	1–1	4–0	2–1	1–1	1–3	2–0
Estudiantes de Medicina	0–2	1–1	2–0	0–0		2–2	1–2	1–1	3–2	0–0	2–3	2–1
Melgar	6–0	1–1	1–0	1–0	6–0		1–2	2–1	5–1	0–3	4–2	2–0
Juan Aurich	1–1	2–3	1–3	2–1	3–1	3–2		3–1	2–1	0–2	4–2	1–1
Sport Boys	2–1	3–0	3–2	1–1	3–0	3–1	3–0		3–2	0–0	3–2	5–2
Sport Coopsol Trujillo	3–1	1–1	2–1	3–2	7–3	4–2	3–2	1–1		1–4	2–1	2–2
Sporting Cristal	5–0	1–1	2–1	2–1	7–2	2–2	1–0	2–0	4–1		3–1	1–2
Unión Minas	1–0	1–3	0–1	2–1	4–1	1–1	0–0	3–0	1–0	0–1		1–3
Universitario	2–0	2–2	3–0	2–0	1–2	0–2	1–2	3–2	0–0	1–2	2–1	

Updated to match(es) played on 2001. Source: RSSSF Peru 2001
Legend: Blue = home team win; Yellow = draw; Red = away team win.

=== Apertura play-off ===
1 July 2001
15:50

Alianza Lima	2–1	Sporting Cristal
Henry Quinteros 35'; Roberto Holsen 67'		Jean Ferrari 58'

Estadio Nacional, Lima
Attendance: 38,966
Referee: Eduardo Lecca
Alianza Lima Apertura 2001 winners
To 2002 Copa Libertadores
(Sporting Cristal to Copa Libertadores play-off)

== Torneo Clausura ==
=== Standings ===
Pos	Team	Pld	W	D	L	GF	GA	GD	Pts	Qualification
1	Cienciano (A, O)	22	14	3	5	39	30	+9	45	Copa Libertadores 2002 First stage
2	Estudiantes de Medicina (A)	22	14	3	5	35	26	+9	45	2002 Copa Libertadores play-off
3	Sporting Cristal	22	14	2	6	44	25	+19	44	
4	Alianza Atlético	22	11	3	8	25	24	+1	36	
5	Sport Boys	22	9	5	8	29	31	−2	32	
6	Universitario	22	8	7	7	29	24	+5	31	
7	Deportivo Wanka	22	8	4	10	22	27	−5	28	
8	Melgar	22	8	2	12	30	31	−1	26	
9	Sport Coopsol Trujillo	22	6	7	9	35	35	0	25	
10	Alianza Lima	22	4	9	9	25	28	−3	21	
11	Unión Minas	22	5	5	12	27	42	−15	20	
12	Juan Aurich	22	3	6	13	22	39	−17	15	

Updated to match(es) played on December 2001. Source: https://www.rsssf.org/tablesp/peru01.html
Rules for classification: 1) points; 2) goal difference; 3) number of goals scored.
(A) Advance to a further round; (O) Play-off winners

=== Results ===
Home \ Away	AAS	ALI	CIE	WAN	EST	MEL	JA	SBA	COO	CRI	MIN	UNI
Alianza Atlético		2–1	2–0	1–0	0–1	2–1	3–1	3–1	0–0	2–1	3–2	0–0
Alianza Lima	1–2		0–0	2–1	1–2	0–1	3–0	2–0	2–2	0–0	1–0	1–1
Cienciano	2–0	4–2		2–1	4–1	1–0	2–0	2–0	4–2	4–1	2–1	1–0
Deportivo Wanka	1–0	0–0	2–3		0–2	1–0	3–0	2–1	1–4	1–0	1–0	2–0
Estudiantes de Medicina	2–0	2–2	2–1	0–2		1–2	1–0	2–1	1–0	1–2	2–1	1–0
Melgar	1–0	4–4	1–2	4–1	0–1		2–0	1–2	1–2	0–3	1–2	2–0
Juan Aurich	2–3	2–1	1–1	0–0	2–3	0–1		0–1	1–1	0–1	4–2	1–1
Sport Boys	2–0	1–1	2–2	4–1	2–1	1–0	0–2		2–1	1–0	1–1	2–2
Sport Coopsol Trujillo	0–1	0–0	4–0	0–0	3–4	1–4	2–2	1–2		3–1	5–2	2–2
Sporting Cristal	3–0	1–0	4–0	1–0	1–1	4–3	1–0	4–2	1–2		8–3	1–0
Unión Minas	1–1	1–0	0–1	1–1	1–3	1–1	2–2	2–0	2–0	1–3		1–0
Universitario	1–0	2–1	4–1	2–1	1–1	2–0	5–2	1–1	2–0	1–3	2–0	

Updated to match(es) played on 2001. Source: RSSSF Peru 2001
Legend: Blue = home team win; Yellow = draw; Red = away team win.

=== Clausura play-off ===
19 December 2001
19:00

Cienciano	1–0	Estudiantes de Medicina
Ernesto Zapata 18'

Estadio Monumental UNSA, Arequipa
Attendance: 30,000
Referee: Ángel Ziani
Cienciano Clausura 2001 winners
To 2002 Copa Libertadores
(Estudiantes to Copa Libertadores play-off)

== Copa Libertadores play-off ==
23 December 2001
15:30

Estudiantes de Medicina	4–3	Sporting Cristal
Germán Carty 12' 30' 54' 82'		Luis Bonnet 86' 87'; David Soria 93'

Estadio Nacional, Lima
Attendance: 2,511
Referee: Gilberto Hidalgo
26 December 2001
19:00

Sporting Cristal	3–0	Estudiantes de Medicina
David Soria 2'; Jorge Soto 14'; Julinho 43'

Estadio Nacional, Lima
Attendance: 7,346
Referee: Eduardo Lecca
Sporting Cristal to 2002 Copa Libertadores

== Title play-off ==
22 December 2001
15:30

Alianza Lima	3–2	Cienciano
Waldir Sáenz 20'; Jorge Soto 57'; Roberto Farfán 90'		Carlos Cumapa 29'; Ernesto Zapata 35' (pen.)

Estadio Alejandro Villanueva, Lima
Attendance: 24,774
Referee: Eduardo Lecca
26 December 2001
15:30

Cienciano	1–0	Alianza Lima
Ramón Rodríguez 83'
Penalties
Luis Molina (penalty scored); Martín García (penalty missed); Cristian García (penalty scored); Ernesto Zapata (penalty missed)	2–4	José Soto (penalty scored); Henry Quinteros (penalty scored); Roger Serrano (penalty scored); Roberto Holsen (penalty missed); Waldir Sáenz (penalty scored)

Estadio Garcilaso, Cusco
Attendance: 16,670
Referee: Gilberto Hidalgo

== Aggregate table ==
Pos	Team	Pld	W	D	L	GF	GA	GD	Pts	Qualification or relegation
1	Sporting Cristal	44	27	9	8	90	43	+47	90	Copa Libertadores 2002 First stage
2	Cienciano	44	25	5	14	82	58	+24	80	Copa Libertadores 2002 First stage
3	Alianza Lima (C)	44	17	16	11	67	47	+20	67	Copa Libertadores 2002 First stage
4	Alianza Atlético	44	20	6	18	49	63	−14	66	
5	Estudiantes de Medicina	44	19	8	17	60	79	−19	65	
6	Sport Boys	44	18	9	17	65	71	−6	63	
7	Melgar	44	18	7	19	75	61	+14	61	
8	Universitario	44	16	12	16	58	54	+4	60	
9	Sport Coopsol Trujillo	44	13	11	20	73	83	−10	50	
10	Deportivo Wanka (A)	44	12	10	22	49	63	−14	46	Qualification for Promotion/relegation play-off
11	Juan Aurich (A, O)	44	12	10	22	56	78	−22	46	
12	Unión Minas (R)	44	12	7	25	57	81	−24	43	Relegation to 2002 Copa Perú

Updated to match(es) played on December 2001. Source: https://www.rsssf.org/tablesp/peru01.html
Rules for classification: 1) points; 2) goal difference; 3) number of goals scored.
(A) Advance to a further round; (C) Champions; (O) Play-off winners; (R) Relegated

== 10th/11th place play-off ==
22 December 2001
15:30

Juan Aurich	2–1 (a.e.t.)	Deportivo Wanka
Nilson Álvarez 35'; Adrián Torres 110'		Roberto Dolorier 9'

Estadio Nacional, Lima
Attendance: 691
Referee: Freddy Arellanos
Deportivo Wanka to Relegation play-off

== Promotion/relegation play-off ==
The promotion/relegation play-off was a two-legged series played by the team placing 11th in the 2001 Primera División, Deportivo Wanka and the 2001 Segunda División champion Alcides Vigo.

29 December 2001
15:00

Deportivo Wanka	1–0 (a.e.t.)	Alcides Vigo
Jorge Ramírez 99'

Estadio Alejandro Villanueva, Lima
Attendance: 2,216
Referee: Ángel Ziani
Deportivo Wanka remained in Primera División

== Top scorers ==
21 goals

- Jorge Ramírez (Wanka)

19 goals

- Paul Cominges (Estudiantes de Medicina)

18 goals

- Johan Fano (Unión Minas, Sport Boys)

17 goals

- Jorge Soto (Sporting Cristal)

16 goals

- Luis A. Bonnet (Sporting Cristal)
- Pedro Ascoy (Juan Aurich)

== See also ==
- 2001 Peruvian Segunda División
- 2001 Copa Perú
