= Isabela Soccer Club =

Puerto Rican soccer team

- Full name: Isabela Soccer Club Northwest Garden
- Nickname: Isabela SC
- Founded: 2011
- Stadium: Parque Comunidad Jobos; Isabela, Puerto Rico
- Capacity: 300
- Chairman: (Puerto Rico) Pedro Piñero
- League: Liga Nacional de Futbol de Puerto Rico
- Website: http://www.isabelasoccer.com/
Home colors

Isabela SC was an association football team in Isabela, Puerto Rico that played in the Liga Nacional de Futbol de Puerto Rico. Their debut took place during the 2012 season.
