= San Juan United =

Puerto Rican soccer team

- Full name: San Juan United FC
- Stadium: Rebekah Colberg; San Juan, Puerto Rico
- Chairman: (Puerto Rico) Carlos Sanchez
- Manager: (Puerto Rico) Manuel Romero
- League: Liga Nacional

San Juan United FC is a Puerto Rican soccer team that plays in the Puerto Rico Soccer League 2nd Division. They also play in the Liga Nacional. The team was founded in 2008 by Mr. Carlos Torres, an ex-member of the Puerto Rico Islanders F.C., a local professional soccer team that competed in the premier division of the USISL/United Soccer Leagues (USL). Mr. Torres was also an ex-member of the Puerto Rico National Team that competed in the 2010 CONCACAF World Cup Qualifier stages contested in the Caribbean. The team logo and uniforms during the team's first season were designed to resemble some features that are unique to the logo and uniform of D.C. United of Major League Soccer (MLS).

== 2008 season ==
The team finished with a record of 3-1-3.

== Liga Nacional ==
The team lost their first game 4-0 to Club Deportivo Gallitos

== Current squad ==
Note: Flags indicate national team as defined under FIFA eligibility rules; some limited exceptions apply. Players may hold more than one non-FIFA nationality.

| No. | Pos. | Nation | Player |
|---|---|---|---|
| 8 | FW | PUR | Francisco Morales |
| 10 | MF | PUR | Edwin Montes |
| 22 | DF | PER | Daniel Ortiz |
| 23 | DF | PUR | Jesús Martínez |

| No. | Pos. | Nation | Player |
|---|---|---|---|
| — | DF | PUR | Joshua Martínez |
| — | FW | PUR | Santos Rivera |
| — | | PUR | Roberto Díaz |
