= Spartans FC Puerto Rico =

Association football club based in San Juan, Puerto Rico

Spartans FC
- Full name: Spartans FC
- Founded: 2008; 18 years ago
- Stadium: Estadio de Aguadilla; Aguadilla, Puerto Rico
- Capacity: 5,000
- Chairman: (Puerto Rico)
- Manager: (Puerto Rico)
- League: Liga Nacional
- 2015: PRSL Champions (1st)
Home colors	Away colors

Aguadilla Spartans FC is a football team that plays in San Juan, Puerto Rico in the Liga Nacional de Futbol de Puerto Rico.

== 2008 season ==
Spartans FC finished with a record of 6-1-1.

== Liga Nacional ==
Lost their first game 1-0 to Huracan FC.

== Current squad ==
Note: Flags indicate national team as defined under FIFA eligibility rules; some limited exceptions apply. Players may hold more than one non-FIFA nationality.

No. / Pos. / Nation / Player; — / FW / PUR / William Nieves	No. / Pos. / Nation / Player

== Accomplishments ==
=== Puerto Rico Soccer League ===
Excellence Cup

- Champions: 2015

=== Year-by-year ===
Season	PRSL									Overall	CFU Club Championship	Top goalscorer		Managers
Season	Div.	Pos.	Pl.	W	D	L	GS	GA	P	Overall	CFU Club Championship	Name	League	Managers
2015	Champions	1st	10	7	3	0	34	10	27	1st	Did not enter	(Puerto Rico)		(Puerto Rico)
