= San Juan Sharks =

Puerto Rican soccer team

San Juan Sharks is a Puerto Rican soccer team who plays in San Juan. They play in the 2nd Division of the Puerto Rico Soccer League.

== 2008 season ==
The team finished the season with a record of 7–0–0. They had an incredible 47 goals and allowed 0 goals in the 7 matches they played.
