= Yabucoa Borikén =

Yabucoa Boriken
- Full name: Yabucoa Boriken
- Stadium: Yabucoa, Puerto Rico
- League: Liga Nacional

Yabucoa Boriken is a Puerto Rican soccer team that plays in Yabucoa. They play in the 2nd Division of the Puerto Rico Soccer League. They also play in the Liga Nacional.

== 2008 season ==
The team finished the season with a record of 4-5.

== Liga Nacional ==
Lost their first game 2–1 to Maunabo Leones.
