= Nestor Morales Stadium =

Baseball stadium in Humacao, Puerto Rico

Nestor Morales Stadium Estadio Nestor Morales
- Interactive map of Nestor Morales Stadium; Estadio Nestor Morales
- Location: Humacao, Puerto Rico
- Coordinates: 18.1498°N 65.8357°W
- Owner: Municipality of Humacao
- Operator: Municipality of Humacao
- Capacity: 2,800

Construction
- Opened: 1987

Tenant
- Tornados de Humacao

Nestor Morales Stadium is a baseball stadium in Humacao, Puerto Rico. The stadium, located at the Osvaldo Gil Bosch sports complex is used by the Grises de Humacao double A baseball team and the Tornados de Humacao who play in the Puerto Rico Soccer League.

Nestor Morales Stadium of Humacao, Puerto Rico, was the site where Alejandro García Padilla announced his candidacy for the Puerto Rico governorship for the 2012 elections.
