= The Berkeley Institute =

Coordinates: 32.3029°N 64.7940°W

Location
- 26 Berkeley Rd, HM09; Pembroke Parish; Bermuda

Information
- School type: Senior school
- Motto: Respice Finem! (KeepThe End in View!)
- Founded: September 6, 1897
- Principal: Keisha L. Douglas
- Enrollment: Approx. 500 students
- Website: http://www.berkeley.bm

The Berkeley Institute is a public senior high school in Pembroke Parish, Bermuda. In 2016, it had about 500 students.

The school was established in 1897. It was originally located in the Samaritan's Hall, but in 1902 it moved to its current location. It is one of two public senior schools in the territory.

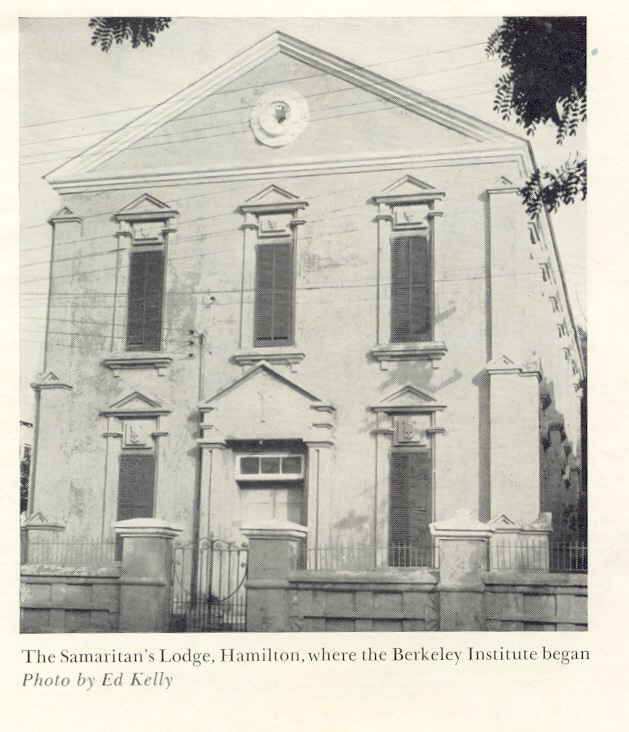
An early photo of the Samaritan's Hall
