= Maunabo Leones =

- Full name: Maunabo Leones FC
- Stadium: Maunabo, Puerto Rico
- League: Liga Nacional de Fútbol de Puerto Rico

Maunabo Leones is a Puerto Rican soccer team which plays in Maunabo. The team plays in the Liga Nacional de Fútbol de Puerto Rico.

== 2008 season ==
The team finished the season with a record of 7–1–1. Their only loss came to Guayanilla Pumas.

== Liga Nacional ==
Defeated Yabucoa Borikén 2-1 in their first game.

=== Kit history ===
- Kit Maker
  - Goltek Sport - (date unknown)

== Current squad ==
Note: Flags indicate national team as defined under FIFA eligibility rules; some limited exceptions apply. Players may hold more than one non-FIFA nationality.

No. / Pos. / Nation / Player	No. / Pos. / Nation / Player
