= Liga Nacional de Fútbol de Puerto Rico =

Association football league of Puerto Rico

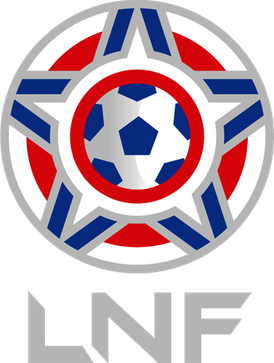
- Founded: July 25, 2009; 16 years ago
- Folded: 2016
- Country: Puerto Rico
- Confederation: CONCACAF
- Number of clubs: 6
- Level on pyramid: 1
- Relegation to: None
- International cup: CFU Club Championship
- Last champions: Criollos de Caguas (1st title)
- Most championships: Bayamón; Maunabo Leones (2 titles each)

The Liga Nacional de Fútbol de Puerto Rico (LNF) was the first division association football league of Puerto Rico, sharing Division 1 status with the Puerto Rico Soccer League. It was organized by the Puerto Rican Football Federation.

The LNF was founded on July 25, 2009 and folded in 2016.

== History ==
The league was founded on July 25, 2009 as the second division of the Puerto Rico Soccer League (PRSL), which was at that time the first division league of Puerto Rico. The Liga Nacional de Fútbol originally had 16 teams that were put into two groups of 8 (East Division and West Division) for the regular season.

The inaugural year began with Yabucoa Borikén taking on Maunabo Leones, as well as San Juan United taking on Club Deportivo Gallitos. Both games were held in Yabucoa. The Playoffs final had Maunabo Leones winning over Bayamón FC.

In 2010, the league size was increased to 21 teams divided into four divisions. The playoffs mixed the top teams in each division together.

During the 2011 season, there were 17 teams and the separate divisions were merged into one division.

In 2012, the league became the first division football league of Puerto Rico upon the folding of the Puerto Rico Soccer League.

In 2015, the league featured six teams.

The league folded in 2016.

== Teams ==
Team	City	Stadium	Cap.	Seasons in LNF	Manager
Liga Nacional de Futbol de Puerto Rico
Bayamón FC	Bayamon, Puerto Rico	Juan Ramón Loubriel Stadium	22,000	2009–2013, 2015–present	Francisco Arias
Criollos de Caguas FC	Caguas, Puerto Rico	Asociación Central de Balompie	1,200	2009–present	(Puerto Rico) Steven Estrada
FC Leones	Ponce, Puerto Rico	Estadio Francisco Montaner	11,537	2011–present	-
Guayama FC	Guayama, Puerto Rico	Cancha de Balompié	1,000	2012–present	-
Tornados de Humacao	Humacao, Puerto Rico	Nestor Morales Stadium	#	2012–present	(Mexico) Eloy Ubaldo Martínez Soto
Yabuco FC	Yabucoa, Puerto Rico	Pista Atlética Adán Fonseca	#	2014–present	-
Academia Quintana	San Juan, Puerto Rico	Hiram Bithorn Stadium	18,264	2009–2011, 2013, 2016–present	(Brazil) Vitor Hugo Barros
Spartans FC	San Juan, Puerto Rico		#	2016–present	-
Metropolitan FA	San Juan, Puerto Rico		#	2016–present	-
Mirabelli SA	Puerto Rico		#	2016–present	-
Puerto Rico United	Aguada, Puerto Rico	Aguada Stadium	4,000	2016–present	Raimundo C. Gatinho
Puerto Rico Giant	Puerto Rico		#	2016–present	-
Isabela Soccer Club	Isabela, Puerto Rico	Pista Francisco "Paco" Dumeng	#	2016–present	-
Leones de Maunabo	Maunabo, Puerto Rico		#	2016–present	-

=== Teams which left before the final season ===
- Aguilas Añasco (2010)
- Atlético Parque FC (2010)
- Club Deportivo Gallitos (2009–10)
- Club Yagüez (2009–10)
- Conquistadores de Guaynabo (2011)
- Gigantes de Carolina FC (2010)
- Guayanilla Pumas (2009–11)
- High Performance FC (2009–10)
- Real Atlantico (2011)
- Roberto Cofresí (2010–11)
- San Juan United (2009)
- Spartans FC Puerto Rico (2009)
- Sport for Nations (2010)
- Yabucoa Borikén (2009–10)

== See also ==
- Puerto Rico Soccer League
- List of Puerto Rican football champions
