= Bayamon City Cup =

- Founded: 2011
- Region: Puerto Rico
- Teams: 10
- Current champions: Puerto Rico FC; (1st title)
- Most championships: Criollos de Caguas FC; (2 titles)
- 2017 Bayamon Cup

The Bayamón City Cup (Spanish: Copa Ciudad de Bayamón) or Bayamón Cup is an association football annual group stage cup competition run by the Football Federation of Puerto Rico.

== History ==
=== 3rd Bayamon Cup 2013 ===
On February 2, 2013, it was announced the cup received a club from the neighboring island of St. Croix which through the Saint Croix Select Soccer Club, will present in the category of U-15 and U-20 men two teams in the event.

== Format ==
The competition is a group- stage elimination tournament that has been contested by 10 teams since the 2017 edition. This pool consists of the 10 Puerto Rican clubs in the 2 professional leagues, which are Puerto Rico Soccer League, Puerto Rico FC in the North American Soccer League, and the tournament also includes Puerto Rico college teams and amateur clubs. The first round, consisting of all teams, are played in 2 groups of 5. The top two teams of both groups played in a semifinal round, and a final match to determine the champion. Every match, including the final, is a one-legged tie that lasts 90 minutes plus any additional stoppage time. If no clear winner has been determined after 90 minutes of normal time, 30 minutes of extra time is played. If the score is still level after extra time then the winner is decided by a penalty shoot-out.

== Champions ==
=== Champions by number of titles ===
Titles	Teams
2	Criollos de Caguas FC
1	Puerto Rico FC

=== Champions by City ===
State	Titles	Teams
Caguas	2	Criollos de Caguas FC (2)
Bayamon	1	Puerto Rico FC (1)
