= Las Justas =

Intercollegiate sports competition held annually in Puerto Rico

Justas de Atletismo y Festival Deportivo (Justas Intercolegiales)
- Formerly: Justas Intercolegiales
- Conference: FISU
- Founded: 1929
- Commissioner: Jorge Sosa
- Sports fielded: 14; men's: 16; women's: 13
- No. of teams: 21
- Headquarters: San Germán, Puerto Rico
- Region: Puerto Rico and U.S.V.I.

The Justas de Atletismo y Festival Deportivo de Puerto Rico (English: Puerto Rico Athletic Games and Sports Festival) —better known as Las Justas Intercolegiales (English: The Intercollegiate Games) or simply as Las Justas (English: The Games)— is an intercollegiate sports competition held annually in Puerto Rico where Puerto Rican colleges and universities compete against each other in different sports. The event is sponsored by the Liga Atlética Interuniversitaria de Puerto Rico (LAI) and includes competitions in softball, basketball, beach volleyball, judo, table tennis, swimming, cheerleading, women's football, and athletics.

The sporting event is supplemented by artistic presentations every evening after athletic events have come to an end. The athletics portion of the events is attended by some 20,000 spectators, while the cultural events receive upwards of 150,000 guests.

For many years the event was held in San Juan, but in 1993 it was moved to the city of Ponce, where it remained until moving to Mayagüez in 2023. The week-long event takes place during the month of April. Due to the 2020 Puerto Rico earthquakes in the Ponce area, the 2020 edition of the Justas was moved from Ponce and were scheduled to take place in Mayagüez from 23 to 25 April at the Jose Antonio Figueroa Freyre Stadium. However, due to the COVID-19 pandemic, the Liga Atlética Interuniversitaria (LAI) announced on 15 March 2020, that the event was being suspended and that a new future date would be sought. Given the island-wide COVID-19 curfew and lockdown ordered by the Government of Puerto Rico subsequent to the 15 March LAI suspension decision date, on 13 April 2020 the LAI announced the event could not be held and canceled it for the remainder of the 2020 season. The 2021 version of the event was also cancelled due to the pandemic. The 2022 games took place from 1-7 May 2022 and were the last ones to be held in Ponce.

Starting in 2023, the event was moved to Mayagüez with the athelitic events taking place at the Mayagüez Athletics Stadium. In September 2025, it was announced that Mayagüez had renewed their agreement to continue hosting the event until at least 2028.

== History ==
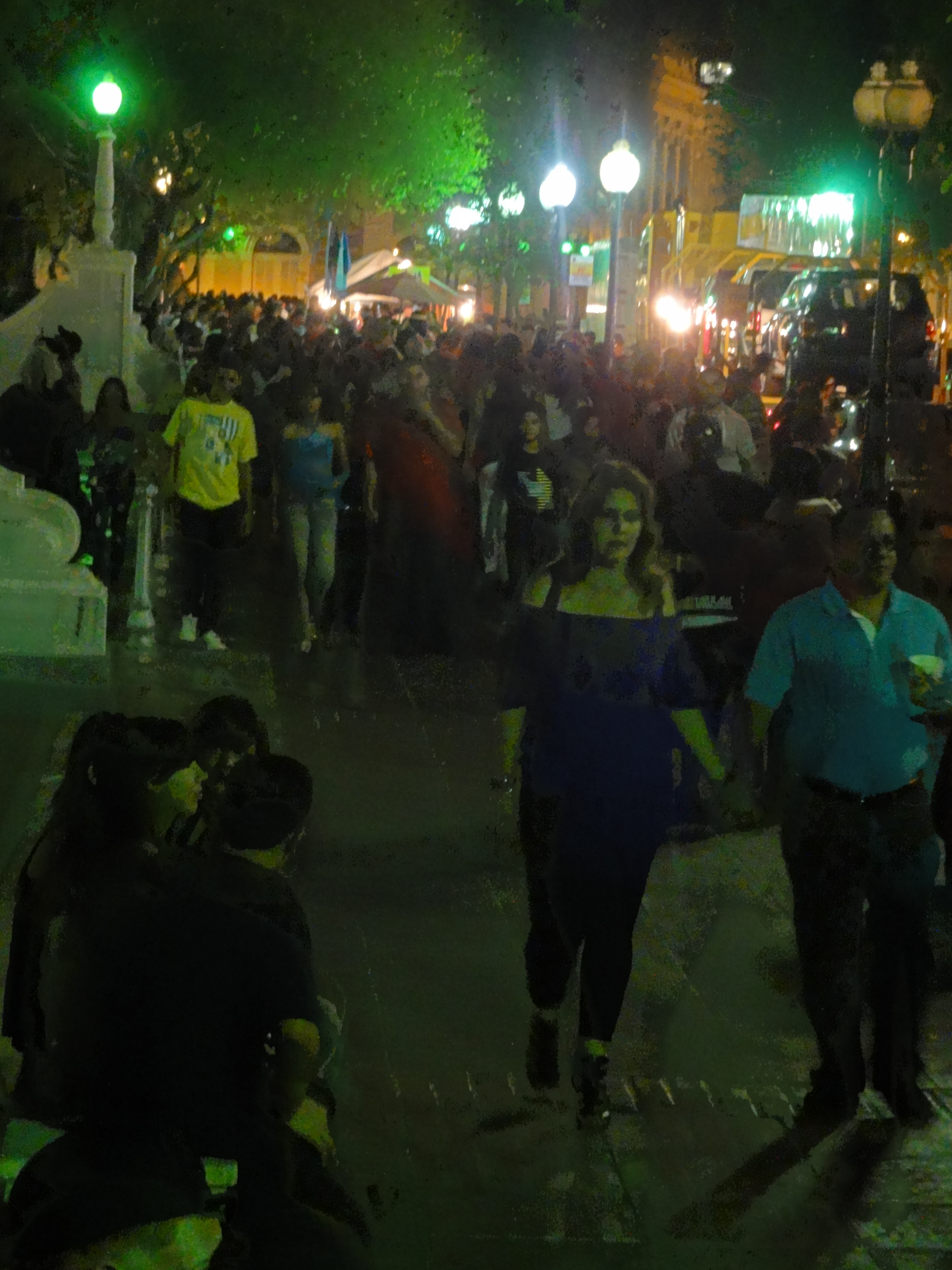
Las Justas 2018, Plaza Las Delicias, Ponce

Las Justas date back to the creation of Liga Atlética Interuniversitaria de Puerto Rico (English: Puerto Rico Intercollegiate Athletic League). The league was founded in 1929 by Cosme Beitía of the University of Puerto Rico, Rio Piedras Campus, Charles Leker for the Instituto Politécnico de San German, and Luis Izquierdo Galo y José D. Morales from the Colegio de Agricultura y Artes Mecánicas of Mayagüez. Las Justas began as a three-event competition between the institutions in the year 1929: baseball, basketball, and athletics.

Originally it included only male participants but starting with the 1969-1970 academic year women began competing as well. Las Justas had been moved to Ponce in 1993 as a test for the 1993 Central American and Caribbean Games. For many years the event was held in San Juan, but in 1993 the event was moved to the city of Ponce which has all the required facilities for holding the event. In 2010 the event was held in Mayagüez in preparation for the 2010 Central American and Caribbean Games. The event resumed in Ponce in 2011, and continued in Ponce in 2012.

== Venue ==
When the event was hosted in Ponce, sporting events would take place at the sports facilities of Pontificia Universidad Católica de Puerto Rico, the athletic field at urbanización Villa del Carmen, Polideportivo at urbanización Los Caobos, Paquito Montaner Stadium, Auditorio Juan Pachín Vicéns, and the Piscina Olímpica Víctor Vassallo. Musical events took place at Plaza Las Delicias. La Guancha is also another recreational and musical venue.

Currently in Mayaguez, sporting events take place at

- Estadio Centro Americano Jose Antonio Figueroa Freyre - Atheletics / Track and Field and Soccer
- Palacio de Recreación y Deportes - Cheer/Dance and Basketball
- Rafael A. Mangual Coliseum - Table Tennis and Judo
- RUM Natatorium - Swimming
- Parque del Litoral - Beach Volleyball
- Hermes Acevedo Park - Women's Softball
- Interamerican University of Puerto Rico - Athletics Prelims

Menwhile musical events would take place in downtown Mayagüez with different stages across the city center. Main stage was located between Jose de Diego street and Mendez Vigo street and adittional stages were located in Calle De La Candelaria and Calle Bosque. In 2026 the concept for the music festival was overhauled due to construction at the Jose De Diego lot where the original stage was placed. The new concept is called Justas Fest and it will feature 3 stages, one outside the Palacio de Recreación y Deportes at the Frankie Ruiz Acoustic stage, one at the Parque de los Próceres and one at Calle Martinez Nadal. The event will take place across three days and for the first time ever it will be a ticketed event with tickets on sale through Ticketera.

== Security ==
With over 200,000 people attending Las Justas every year, security has been a major concern. In 2010, for example, 13 people were arrested for drug activities during the events. Las Justas, it is said, has evolved into a Puerto Rican-style Spring Break. Close to 1,500 security personnel patrol the event for security. A number of items are not permitted in the areas where activities of Las Justas are celebrated, including both sporting events and associated musical celebrations. Coolers, liquids not in their original containers, glass bottles, umbrellas, baseball bats, canes, and fire arms are some of the items that are excluded. In 2012, Enrique Arrarás Mir, the Commissioner of the event, said that “the safest place in all of Puerto Rico during the celebration of Las Justas will be the city of Ponce”. In 2011, in Mayaguez, there were also arrests for drunkness and drug trafficking. In 2014, electronic scanners were implemented at checkpoints, doing away with the former and slower manual frisk system.

In 2025, as part of an initiative to ensure security at the event the Municipality of Mayagüez announced the placement of security cameras that cover the entire downtown area (where the music festival is held). Additionally, the system integrates Artificial Intelligence that can monitor streets automatically and read license plates on vehicles along with high resolution cameras and Pan–tilt–zoom cameras that allow monitoring in real time. The control center for this system is located within Mayagüez City Hall and it is complimented by mobile control centers located in the vicinity of the music festival.

Ahead of the 2026 events it was announced that the music festivals associated with the event would no longer be free with tickets going on sale for the 3 day event through the Ticketera platform. For the new events attendees will have to go through security points and present their tickets before accessing the shows.

== Economy ==
In 2009, it was estimated that Las Justas generate close to $6 million USD in income resulting from food and other sales as well as lodging. In addition to donating the use of the facilities throughout the city, the Ponce Municipal Government also contributes $200,000 to the costs of celebrating Las Justas in Ponce.

In press conference for the 2024 event it was announced that Las Justas have a reported $18 million injection to the Mayagüez economy between its two week span. Furthermore, when you account the economic impact on the surrounding towns in the Mayagüez Metropolitan Area that numbers rises up to $30 million.

== Broadcast ==
The events were relayed via DIRECTV (Puerto Rico Channel 161) and via Canal Universitario Ana G. Méndez “Sistema TV” on channels 40 and 26, as well as streamed via www.sistematv.com.

In 2024, the LAI made an agreement with WAPA Media Group to broadcast every sporting event of Las Justas through their networks and provide coverage through their sports network WAPA Deportes. Since then, events are broadcast through WAPA's subchannel 4.2 (dubbed WAPA Sports) with the network's sports team broadcasting live from a makeshift studio located at the Mayagüez Athletics Stadium for all 2 weeks of the games.

== Sports played ==
- men's baseball
- men's & women's basketball
- men's & women's cross country
- men's & women's judo
- men's & women's soccer
- men's & women's softball
- men's & women's swimming
- men's & women's table tennis
- men's & women's tennis
- men's & women's volleyball
- men's water polo
- men's weightlifting
- men's wrestling
- men's & women's cheerleading (Spanish: “Porrismo”)

== Participants ==
As of 2012, twenty-one universities participate in the event as follows:

Institution (English)	Institution (Spanish)	Acronym	Location	Year joined
University of Puerto Rico, Río Piedras Campus	Universidad de Puerto Rico, Recinto de Río Piedras	UPR	San Juan, Puerto Rico	1929
University of Puerto Rico at Mayagüez	Recinto Universitario de Mayagüez	RUM	Mayagüez, Puerto Rico	1929
Interamerican University of Puerto Rico	Universidad Interamericana de Puerto Rico	UIPR	San German, Puerto Rico	1929
Pontifical Catholic University of Puerto Rico	Pontificia Universidad Católica de Puerto Rico	PUCPR	Ponce, Puerto Rico	1954
University of Puerto Rico at Cayey	Universidad de Puerto Rico en Cayey	UPRC	Cayey, Puerto Rico	1971
University of Turabo	Universidad del Turabo	UT	Gurabo, Puerto Rico	1975
University of Puerto Rico at Humacao	Universidad de Puerto Rico en Humacao	UPRH	Humacao, Puerto Rico	1975
University of the Sacred Heart	Universidad del Sagrado Corazón	USC	Santurce, Puerto Rico	1979
University of Puerto Rico at Bayamón	Universidad de Puerto Rico en Bayamón	UPRB	Bayamón, Puerto Rico	1980
University of Puerto Rico at Arecibo	Universidad de Puerto Rico en Arecibo	UPRA	Arecibo, Puerto Rico	1983
American University of Puerto Rico	Universidad Americana de Puerto Rico	AUPR	Bayamón, Puerto Rico	1991
Bayamón Central University	Universidad Central de Bayamón	UCB	Bayamón, Puerto Rico	1991
University of Puerto Rico at Ponce	Universidad de Puerto Rico en Ponce	UPRP	Ponce, Puerto Rico	1992
University of Puerto Rico at Aguadilla	Universidad de Puerto Rico en Aguadilla	UPAG	Aguadilla, Puerto Rico	1992
University of Puerto Rico at Carolina	Universidad de Puerto Rico en Carolina	UPCA	Carolina, Puerto Rico	1994
University of Puerto Rico at Utuado	Universidad de Puerto Rico en Utuado	UPRU	Utuado, Puerto Rico	1998
Polytechnic University of Puerto Rico	Universidad Politécnica de Puerto Rico	POLI	San Juan, Puerto Rico	1999
University of the East	Universidad del Este	UNE	Carolina, Puerto Rico	2005
Metropolitan University	Universidad Metropolitana	UMET	San Juan, Puerto Rico	2005
Caribbean University	Universidad Caribeña	CU	Bayamón, Puerto Rico	2005
University of the Virgin Islands	Universidad de las Islas Vírgenes	UVI	Saint Thomas, U.S. Virgin Islands	2005

== Winners ==
According to Gabrielle Paese, Las Justas have become “a power struggle between just two universities: Universidad Ana G. Méndez versus San German’s Inter American University. Led by two strong track coaches (Luis Dieppa of Turabo and Freddy Vargas of Inter American U., respectively) the schools compete for the overall title. That means the meet becomes more about which school accumulates the most points and less about individual performance.”

=== 2011 ===
The 2011 winners were as follows:

==== Men's competitions ====
- First Place: Tigres of the Universidad Interamericana de Puerto Rico, 161.50 points.
- Second Place: Pitirres of the Universidad del Este, 144 points.
- Third Place: Taínos of the Universidad del Turabo.

==== Women's competitions ====
- First Place: Cocodrilas of the Universidad Metropolitana, 201 points (also won 1st place during the 2010 season).

=== 2012 ===
The 2012 winners were as follows:

==== Men’s competitions ====
- First Place: Tigres of the Universidad Interamericana, 255 points.
- Second Place: Pontificia Universidad Catolica de Puerto Rico, 210 points.
- Third Place: Gallitos of the University of Puerto Rico, Río Piedras Campus, 146.50 points.
- Fourth Place: Universidad del Sagrado Corazon, 108 points.

==== Women’s competitions ====
- First Place: Taínas of the Universidad del Turabo, 274 points.
- Second Place: Gallitos of the University of Puerto Rico, Río Piedras Campus, 206 points.
- Third Place: Pontificia Universidad Catolica de Puerto Rico, 121 points.
- Fourth Place: Universidad del Sagrado Corazon, 106 points.

=== 2013 ===
The 2013 winners were as follows:

==== Men’s competitions ====
- First Place: Tigres of the Universidad Interamericana de Puerto Rico, 180 points.
- Second Place: Pitirres of the Universidad del Este, 150 points.
- Third Place: Taínos of the Universidad del Turabo, 123 points.
- Fourth Place: Gallitos of the University of Puerto Rico, Río Piedras Campus, 117 points.
- Fifth Place: Cocodrilos of the Universidad del Este, 83 points.

==== Women’s competitions ====
- First Place: Cocodrilas of the Universidad Metropolitana, 152 points.
- Second Place: Pitirres of the Universidad del Este, 142 points.
- Third Place: Tigresas of the Universidad Interamericana, 137 points.
- Fourth Place: Taínas of the Universidad del Turabo, 124 points.

=== Specific sport results ===
==== Dance Teams ====
===== 2008 =====
- 1st University of Puerto Rico, Río Piedras Campus
- 2nd University of Puerto Rico at Bayamón
- 3rd University of Puerto Rico at Ponce
- 4th Universidad del Sagrado Corazon
- 5th Universidad Interamericana

===== 2009 =====
- 1st University of Puerto Rico at Bayamón
- 2nd University of Puerto Rico, Río Piedras Campus
- 3rd Universidad del Sagrado Corazon
- 4th University of Puerto Rico at Ponce
- 5th University of Puerto Rico at Mayagüez

===== 2010 =====
- 1st University of Puerto Rico at Bayamón
- 2nd University of Puerto Rico at Mayagüez
- 3rd Universidad del Sagrado Corazon
- 4th University of Puerto Rico at Carolina
- 5th University of Puerto Rico at Ponce

===== 2011 =====
- 1st University of Puerto Rico at Bayamón
- 2nd Universidad del Sagrado Corazon
- 3rd Universidad Metropolitana
- 4th University of Puerto Rico at Ponce
- 5th University of Puerto Rico at Carolina

===== 2012 =====
- 1st University of Puerto Rico at Bayamón
- 2nd University of Puerto Rico, Río Piedras Campus
- 3rd University of Puerto Rico at Carolina
- 4th University of Puerto Rico at Ponce
- 5th Universidad del Sagrado Corazon

===== 2013 =====
- 1st University of Puerto Rico at Bayamón
- 2nd University of Puerto Rico, Río Piedras Campus
- 3rd Universidad Metropolitana
- 4th University of Puerto Rico at Mayagüez
- 5th Pontificia Universidad Católica de Puerto Rico

===== 2014 =====
- 1st University of Puerto Rico at Bayamón
- 2nd University of Puerto Rico, Río Piedras Campus
- 3rd University of Puerto Rico at Carolina
- 4th Pontificia Universidad Católica de Puerto Rico
- 5th University of Puerto Rico at Ponce

===== 2020 =====
Games not celebrated due to the Covid-19 pandemic.

===== 2021 =====
Games not celebrated due to the Covid-19 pandemic.
