= List of college athletic programs in Puerto Rico =

This is a list of college athletic programs in the U.S. territory of Puerto Rico.

Notes:

- This list is in a tabular format, with columns arranged in the following order, from left to right:
  - Athletic team description (short school name and nickname), with a link to the school's athletic program article if it exists. When only one nickname is listed, it is used for teams of both sexes. (Note that in recent years, many schools have chosen to use the same nickname for men's and women's teams even when the nickname is distinctly masculine.) When two nicknames are given, the first is used for men's teams and the other is used for women's teams. Different nicknames for a specific sport within a school are noted separately below the table.
  - Full name of school.
  - Location of school.
  - Conference of the school (if conference column is left blank, the school is either independent or the conference is unknown).
- Apart from the ongoing conversions, the following notes apply:
  - Following the normal standard of U.S. sports media, the terms "University" and "College" are ignored in alphabetization, unless necessary to distinguish schools (such as Boston College and Boston University) or are actually used by the media in normally describing the school, such as the College of Charleston.
  - Schools are also alphabetized by the names they are most commonly referred to by sports media, with non-intuitive examples included in parentheses next to the school name. This means, for example, that campuses bearing the name "University of North Carolina" may variously be found at "C" (Charlotte), "N" (North Carolina, referring to the Chapel Hill campus), and "U" (the Asheville, Greensboro, Pembroke, and Wilmington campuses, all normally referred to as UNC-{campus name}).
  - The prefix "St.", as in "Saint", is alphabetized as if it were spelled out.

== NCAA ==
=== Division II ===
Full NCAA Division II member colleges in Puerto Rico.

Team	School	City	Conference	Sport sponsorship				
Team	School	City	Conference	Foot- ball	Basketball		Soccer	
Team	School	City	Conference	Foot- ball	M	W	M	W
Puerto Rico–Bayamón Cowboys (Note: Maintains dual membership between the NCAA and the Liga Atlética Interuniversitaria de Puerto Rico (LAI))	University of Puerto Rico at Bayamón	Bayamón	Independent	No	Yes	Yes	Yes	Yes
Puerto Rico–Mayagüez Tarzans	University of Puerto Rico at Mayagüez	Mayagüez	Independent	No	Yes	Yes	No	No
Puerto Rico–Río Piedras Gallitos	University of Puerto Rico at Río Piedras	San Juan	Independent	No	Yes	Yes	No	No

== LAI ==
Team	School	City
Ana G. Méndez Taínos y Taínas	Ana G. Méndez University	San Juan
Bayamón Central Halcones	Bayamón Central University	Bayamón
Caribbean Gryphons	Caribbean University	Bayamón
Interamerican Tigres	Interamerican University of Puerto Rico	San German
Polytechnic Castores	Polytechnic University of Puerto Rico	San Juan
Pontifical Catholic Pioneros	Pontifical Catholic University of Puerto Rico	Ponce
Puerto Rico–Aguadilla Tiburones	University of Puerto Rico at Aguadilla	Aguadilla
Puerto Rico–Arecibo Lobos y Lobas	University of Puerto Rico at Arecibo	Arecibo
Puerto Rico–Bayamón Vaqueros y Vaqueras (Note: Also a full member of NCAA Division II)	University of Puerto Rico at Bayamón	Bayamón
Puerto Rico–Carolina Jaguares	University of Puerto Rico at Carolina	Carolina
Puerto Rico–Cayey Toritos y Toritas	University of Puerto Rico at Cayey	Cayey
Puerto Rico–Humacao Buhos y Buhas	University of Puerto Rico at Humacao	Humacao
Puerto Rico–Mayagüez Tarzanes y Juanas	University of Puerto Rico at Mayagüez	Mayagüez
Puerto Rico–Ponce Leones y Leonas	University of Puerto Rico at Ponce	Ponce
Puerto Rico–Río Piedras Gallitos y Jerezanas	University of Puerto Rico at Río Piedras	San Juan
Puerto Rico–Utuado Guaraguaos	University of Puerto Rico at Utuado	Utuado
Sacred Heart Delfines	University of the Sacred Heart (Puerto Rico)	Santurce

== See also ==
- Liga Atlética Interuniversitaria de Puerto Rico
- List of NCAA Division I institutions
- List of NCAA Division II institutions
- List of NCAA Division III institutions
- List of NAIA institutions
- List of USCAA institutions
- List of NCCAA institutions
