= List of state and territorial universities in the United States =

In the United States, a state college or state university is one of the public colleges or universities funded by or associated with the state government. In some cases, these institutions of higher learning are part of a state university system, while in other cases they are not. Several U.S. territories also administer public colleges and universities.

Although most of these institutions are associated with state governments, a small number of public institutions are directly funded and governed by the U.S. federal government, including the service academies, the Community College of the Air Force, the Naval Postgraduate School, the Air Force Institute of Technology, the Uniformed Services University of the Health Sciences, military war colleges and staff colleges, and Haskell Indian Nations University. A few universities – George Washington University, Georgetown University, Gallaudet University, Howard University, and American University – are private universities in the District of Columbia that are federally chartered by the United States Government.

Most state universities receive at least part of their funding from the state, although many have substantial income from tuition and fees, endowment proceeds, donations (such as from alumni or philanthropists), and revenue from royalties. State universities usually offer lower tuition costs to in-state residents. Substantial financial support is also provided by the federal government, particularly through federal financial aid.

In some states, there is a campus designated as the "flagship" campus in the state's university system. The flagship campus is the most prestigious or the one with the largest student population, e.g. the University of Maryland, College Park campus in the University System of Maryland, the Indiana University Bloomington campus in the Indiana University System, and the University of Tennessee, Knoxville campus in the University of Tennessee System.

There are a number of states that have more than one university system, e.g. California with 2; Colorado with 2; Indiana with 2; New York with 2; Tennessee with 2; and Texas with 7 (the most).

Notes:

- The list includes schools that grant first-professional doctorates only (e.g., medical schools, law schools, or veterinary schools) that are independent of any other school in a state system.
- Satellite campuses that do not have accreditation separate from the mother institution are not included in the list, e.g. University of Washington Tacoma remains an integral part of the University of Washington, which is based in Seattle. On the other hand, institutions like University of Houston–Downtown and University of California, Santa Cruz are provided separate entries as they are considered independent, autonomous institutions.
- To see a list of community colleges and technical centers in the United States that offer only associate's degrees, visit the community colleges list.
- To see a list of tribal colleges and universities in the United States, visit the tribal colleges and universities list.
- Non-bachelor's degree-granting institutions, such as graduate schools, are listed in italics.

== Alabama ==
- Alabama A&M University
- Alabama State University
- Athens State University
- Auburn University system
  - Auburn University
  - Auburn University at Montgomery
- Jacksonville State University
- Troy University
- University of Alabama System
  - University of Alabama (Alabama) (Tuscaloosa – flagship/main campus)
  - University of Alabama at Birmingham (UAB)
  - University of Alabama in Huntsville (UAH)
- University of Montevallo
- University of North Alabama (UNA)
- University of South Alabama (USA)
- University of West Alabama (UWA)

== Alaska ==
- University of Alaska System
  - University of Alaska Fairbanks (UAF) (Fairbanks – flagship/main campus)
  - University of Alaska Anchorage (UAA)
  - University of Alaska Southeast (UAS)

== Arizona ==
- Arizona Board of Regents
  - Arizona State University (ASU)
  - Northern Arizona University (NAU)
  - University of Arizona (UofA)

== Arkansas ==
- University of Arkansas System
  - University of Arkansas (Arkansas) (Fayetteville – flagship/main campus)
  - University of Arkansas–Fort Smith
  - University of Arkansas at Little Rock
  - University of Arkansas for Medical Sciences
  - University of Arkansas at Monticello
  - University of Arkansas at Pine Bluff
  - University of Arkansas Grantham
- Arkansas State University System
  - Arkansas State University
  - Henderson State University
- Arkansas Tech University
- University of Central Arkansas (UCA, Central Arkansas)
- Southern Arkansas University (SAU)

== California ==
- University of California system
  - University of California, Berkeley (UC Berkeley, Cal, UCB)
  - University of California, Davis (UC Davis, UCD)
  - University of California, Irvine (UC Irvine, UCI)
  - University of California, Los Angeles (UCLA)
  - University of California, Merced (UC Merced, UCM)
  - University of California, Riverside (UC Riverside, UCR)
  - University of California, San Diego (UC San Diego, UCSD)
  - University of California, San Francisco (UCSF)
  - University of California, Santa Barbara (UC Santa Barbara, UCSB)
  - University of California, Santa Cruz (UC Santa Cruz, UCSC)
  - University of California College of the Law, San Francisco (UC Law SF) (law school; administered separately from the other UC campuses)
- California State University system
  - Cal Poly Maritime Academy (Cal Poly Maritime, The Academy)
  - California State University, Bakersfield (CSUB)
  - California State University, Channel Islands (CSUCI)
  - California State University, Chico (Chico State)
  - California State University, Dominguez Hills (CSUDH)
  - California State University, East Bay (CSUEB)
  - California State University, Fresno (Fresno State)
  - California State University, Fullerton (CSUF, Cal State Fullerton)
  - California State Polytechnic University, Humboldt (Cal Poly Humboldt)
  - California State University, Long Beach (Long Beach State, LBSU, Cal State Long Beach, CSULB)
  - California State University, Los Angeles (CSULA, Cal State LA)
  - California State University, Monterey Bay (CSUMB)
  - California State University, Northridge (CSUN)
  - California State Polytechnic University, Pomona (Cal Poly Pomona, CPP)
  - California State University, Sacramento (Sacramento State, Sac State)
  - California State University, San Bernardino (CSUSB)
  - San Diego State University (SDSU, San Diego State)
  - San Francisco State University (SFSU)
  - San Jose State University (SJSU, San Jose State)
  - California Polytechnic State University, San Luis Obispo (Cal Poly, Cal Poly San Luis Obispo, Cal Poly SLO)
  - California State University San Marcos (CSUSM)
  - Sonoma State University (SSU, Sonoma State)
  - California State University, Stanislaus (Stan State)

== Colorado ==
- Adams State University
- University of Colorado system
  - University of Colorado Boulder (Colorado or CU) (Boulder – flagship/main campus)
  - University of Colorado Colorado Springs (UCCS)
  - University of Colorado Denver (CU-Denver)
  - Anschutz Medical Campus
- Colorado Mesa University
- Colorado School of Mines
- Colorado State University System
  - Colorado State University (Colorado State) (Fort Collins – flagship/main campus)
  - Colorado State University Pueblo (CSU-Pueblo)
  - Colorado State University–Global Campus (CSU–Global) – online only
- Fort Lewis College
- Metropolitan State University of Denver
- University of Northern Colorado
- Western Colorado University (Western)

== Connecticut ==
- Charter Oak State College (COSC)
- Connecticut State University System
  - Central Connecticut State University (CCSU, Central Connecticut)
  - Eastern Connecticut State University (ECSU, Eastern Connecticut)
  - Southern Connecticut State University (SCSU, Southern Connecticut)
  - Western Connecticut State University (WCSU, Western Connecticut)
- University of Connecticut (UConn)

== Delaware ==
- University of Delaware (UD)
- Delaware State University (Del State)

== District of Columbia ==
- University of the District of Columbia (UDC)

Universities chartered by Congress (Congressional Charter) are not public state or territorial universities; they are private non-profit universities that do not grant in-state tuition discounts to District of Columbia residents unlike other government-funded state or territorial universities. The United States Federal Government provides tuition grants to District of Columbia residents through the DC Tuition Assistance Grant (DC TAG) towards the difference in price between in-state and out-of-state tuition at public four-year colleges/universities and private Historically Black Colleges and Universities throughout the U.S., Guam, and Puerto Rico. Small amounts of the grant can be used for Washington Metropolitan Area private universities within close proximity of the District.

== Florida ==
- State University System of Florida
  - Florida A&M University (FAMU)
  - Florida Atlantic University (FAU)
  - Florida Gulf Coast University (FGCU)
  - Florida International University (FIU)
  - Florida Polytechnic University (Florida Poly or FPU)
  - Florida State University (FSU)
  - New College of Florida (New College or NCF)
  - University of Central Florida (UCF)
  - University of Florida (UF)
  - University of North Florida (UNF)
  - University of South Florida System
    - University of South Florida (USF)
    - University of South Florida Sarasota–Manatee (USFSM)
    - University of South Florida St. Petersburg (USFSP)
  - University of West Florida (UWF)
- Florida College System (community college system which offers bachelor's degrees at most of its institutions)
  - Broward College
  - Chipola College
  - College of Central Florida
  - Daytona State College
  - Eastern Florida State College
  - Florida Gateway College
  - Florida SouthWestern State College
  - Florida State College at Jacksonville
  - Gulf Coast State College
  - Indian River State College
  - Lake–Sumter State College
  - Miami Dade College
  - Northwest Florida State College
  - Palm Beach State College
  - Pasco–Hernando State College
  - Pensacola State College
  - Polk State College
  - Santa Fe College
  - Seminole State College of Florida
  - South Florida State College
  - St. Johns River State College
  - St. Petersburg College
  - State College of Florida, Manatee–Sarasota
  - Tallahassee State College
  - Valencia College

== Georgia ==
- University System of Georgia
  - Abraham Baldwin Agricultural College (Abraham Baldwin)
  - Albany State University
  - Atlanta Metropolitan State College
  - Augusta University (Augusta)
  - Clayton State University
  - College of Coastal Georgia (Coastal)
  - Columbus State University
  - Dalton State College
  - Fort Valley State University (Fort Valley)
  - Georgia Archives
  - Georgia College & State University (Georgia College)
  - Georgia Gwinnett College
  - Georgia Highlands College (Highlands)
  - Georgia Public Library Service
  - Georgia Institute of Technology (Georgia Tech)
  - Georgia Southern University
  - Georgia Southwestern State University (GSW)
  - Georgia State University (GSU)
  - Gordon State College
  - Kennesaw State University (KSU)
  - Middle Georgia State University
  - Savannah State University (SSU)
  - South Georgia State College (SGSC)
  - University of Georgia (UGA)
  - University of North Georgia (UNG)
  - University of West Georgia (UWG)
  - Valdosta State University (VSU)

== Guam ==
- University of Guam

== Hawaii ==
- University of Hawaiʻi System
  - University of Hawaiʻi at Mānoa (Hawaii or UH) (Honolulu – flagship/main campus)
  - University of Hawaiʻi at Hilo (UH Hilo)
  - University of Hawaiʻi at West Oʻahu (UHWO)
  - York University USA Honolulu (Hawaii or UH) (Honolulu

== Idaho ==
- Boise State University (Boise State or BSU)
- University of Idaho (U of I or UI)
- Idaho State University (Idaho State or ISU)
- Lewis–Clark State College

== Illinois ==
- Chicago State University (Chicago State)
- Eastern Illinois University (Eastern Illinois, EIU)
- Governors State University
- Illinois State University (Illinois State, ISU)
- University of Illinois System
  - University of Illinois Urbana-Champaign (Illinois, U of I, UIUC) (Urbana and Champaign – flagship/main campus)
  - University of Illinois Chicago (UIC)
  - University of Illinois Springfield (UIS)
- Northeastern Illinois University (NEIU)
- Northern Illinois University (Northern Illinois, NIU)
- Southern Illinois University system
  - Southern Illinois University Carbondale (Southern Illinois, SIU) (Carbondale – flagship/main campus)
  - Southern Illinois University Edwardsville (SIUE)
- Western Illinois University (Western Illinois, WIU)

== Indiana ==
- Ball State University
- Indiana University system
  - Indiana University Bloomington (Indiana or IU) (Bloomington – flagship/main campus)
  - Indiana University Columbus (IUC)
  - Indiana University East (IUE)
  - Indiana University Fort Wayne
  - Indiana University Indianapolis (IUI)
  - Indiana University Kokomo (IUK)
  - Indiana University Northwest
  - Indiana University South Bend (IUSB)
  - Indiana University Southeast
- Indiana State University
- Purdue University system
  - Purdue University (West Lafayette – flagship/main campus)
  - Purdue University Fort Wayne (PFW)
  - Purdue University Global
  - Purdue University in Indianapolis
  - Purdue University Northwest – (2016 Merger of Purdue University Calumet and Purdue University North Central)
  - Purdue University Online
- University of Southern Indiana (USI)
- Vincennes University (VU)

== Iowa ==
- University of Iowa (Iowa)
- Iowa State University (ISU)
- University of Northern Iowa (UNI)

== Kansas ==
- Emporia State University (Emporia State or ESU)
- Fort Hays State University (FHSU)
- University of Kansas (Kansas or KU)
- Kansas State University (K-State or KSU)
- Pittsburg State University
- Wichita State University

Note: Washburn University in Topeka is a municipally-chartered, state-coordinated university. Some funds are sourced from municipal and county taxes, while some financial support is also received from the state of Kansas.

== Kentucky ==
- Eastern Kentucky University (EKU)
- University of Kentucky (Kentucky or UK)
- Kentucky State University
- University of Louisville (Louisville, U of L, or UL)
- Morehead State University
- Murray State University
- Northern Kentucky University (NKU)
- Western Kentucky University (WKU)

== Louisiana ==
- Louisiana State University System
  - Louisiana State University and Agricultural and Mechanical College (LSU) (Baton Rouge – flagship/main campus)
  - Louisiana State University Agricultural Center
  - Louisiana State University at Eunice (LSU-Eunice)
  - Louisiana State University of Alexandria (LSU-Alexandria)
  - Louisiana State University Shreveport (LSU-Shreveport)
  - LSU New Orleans (LSUNO)
  - LSU Health Sciences Center New Orleans
  - LSU Health Sciences Center Shreveport
  - Paul M. Hebert Law Center (law school on the main Baton Rouge campus, separate institution)
  - Pennington Biomedical Research Center
- University of Louisiana System
  - Grambling State University (GSU)
  - Louisiana Tech University (Louisiana Tech or La Tech)
  - McNeese State University (MSU)
  - Nicholls State University
  - Northwestern State University (NSULA)
  - Southeastern Louisiana University (SELU)
  - University of Louisiana at Lafayette (UL Lafayette)
  - University of Louisiana at Monroe (ULM)
- Southern University System
  - Southern University (Baton Rouge – flagship/main campus)
  - Southern University at New Orleans (SUNO)
  - Southern University at Shreveport (SUSLA)
  - Southern University Law Center (SULC)
  - Southern University Agricultural Research and Extension Center

== Maine ==
- Maine Maritime Academy
- University of Maine System
  - University of Maine (UMaine or Maine) (Orono – flagship university)
  - University of Maine School of Law (Maine Law)
  - University of Maine at Augusta (UMaine Augusta, UM-Augusta, or UMA)
  - University of Maine at Farmington (UMaine Farmington, UM-Farmington, or UMF)
  - University of Maine at Fort Kent (UMaine Fort Kent, UM-Fort Kent, or UMFK)
  - University of Maine at Machias (UMaine Machias, UM-Machias, or UMM, pronounced "UM M")
  - University of Maine at Presque Isle (UMaine Presque Isle, UM-Presque Isle, or UMPI, pronounced "UM PI")
  - University of Southern Maine (Southern Maine or USM)

== Maryland ==
- Morgan State University
- St. Mary's College of Maryland
- University System of Maryland
  - University of Maryland, College Park (Maryland or UMD) (College Park – flagship/main campus)
  - Bowie State University
  - Coppin State University
  - Frostburg State University
  - Salisbury University
  - Towson University (Towson)
  - University of Baltimore (UB)
  - University of Maryland, Baltimore (UM Baltimore or UMB)
  - University of Maryland, Baltimore County (UMBC)
  - University of Maryland Eastern Shore (UMES)
  - University of Maryland Global Campus (UMGC)
  - Universities at Shady Grove
  - University System of Maryland at Hagerstown
  - University System of Maryland at Southern Maryland
  - University of Maryland Center for Environmental Science

== Massachusetts ==
- University of Massachusetts system
  - University of Massachusetts Amherst (Massachusetts, UMass, UMass Amherst) (Amherst – flagship/main campus)
  - University of Massachusetts Boston (UMass Boston)
  - University of Massachusetts Dartmouth (UMass Dartmouth)
  - University of Massachusetts School of Law (UMass Law)
  - University of Massachusetts Lowell (UMass Lowell)
  - University of Massachusetts Global (UMass Global)
  - University of Massachusetts Medical School
- State University system
  - Bridgewater State University
  - Fitchburg State University
  - Framingham State University
  - Salem State University
  - Westfield State University
  - Worcester State University
  - Massachusetts College of Art and Design (MassArt)
  - Massachusetts College of Liberal Arts
  - Massachusetts Maritime Academy

== Michigan ==
- Central Michigan University
- Eastern Michigan University
- Ferris State University
- Grand Valley State University
- Lake Superior State University
- University of Michigan
- University of Michigan–Dearborn
- University of Michigan–Flint
- Michigan State University
- Michigan Technological University
- Northern Michigan University
- Oakland University
- Saginaw Valley State University
- Wayne State University
- Western Michigan University

== Minnesota ==
- Minnesota State Colleges and Universities system (Listed below are the state universities. The Minnesota State system also includes the state's community and technical colleges.)
  - Bemidji State University
  - Minnesota State University, Mankato (Mankato – flagship campus)
  - Minnesota State University Moorhead
  - Metropolitan State University
  - Southwest Minnesota State University
  - St. Cloud State University
  - Winona State University
- University of Minnesota system
  - University of Minnesota, Twin Cities (U of M or Minnesota) (Minneapolis – flagship/main campus)
  - University of Minnesota Crookston
  - University of Minnesota Duluth
  - University of Minnesota Morris
  - University of Minnesota Rochester

== Mississippi ==
- Alcorn State University (Alcorn)
- Delta State University (Delta State)
- Jackson State University (Jackson State or JSU)
- Mississippi State University (Mississippi State or MSU)
- Mississippi University for Women (MUW)
- Mississippi Valley State University
- University of Mississippi (Ole Miss)
- University of Southern Mississippi (Southern Miss or USM)

== Missouri ==
- University of Central Missouri (UCM)
- Harris–Stowe State University
- Lincoln University of Missouri
- University of Missouri System
  - University of Missouri (Missouri or Mizzou) (Columbia – flagship/main campus)
  - University of Missouri–Kansas City (UMKC)
  - Missouri University of Science and Technology (Missouri S&T)
  - University of Missouri–St. Louis (UMSL)
- Missouri Southern State University
- Missouri State University (formerly Southwest Missouri State University)
- Missouri Western State University
- Northwest Missouri State University
- Southeast Missouri State University
- Truman State University (formerly Northeast Missouri State University)

== Montana ==
- Montana University System (Listed below are the state universities. The MUS also includes the state's community, technical, and tribal colleges.)
  - Montana State University System
    - Montana State University (Montana State) (Bozeman – flagship/main campus)
    - Montana State University Billings (Billings)
    - Montana State University–Northern (Havre)
    - Great Falls College (Great Falls)
  - University of Montana System
    - University of Montana (Montana) (Missoula – flagship/main campus)
    - Helena College (in Helena)
    - University of Montana Western (Dillon)
    - Montana Technological University (Montana Tech)

== Nebraska ==
- Nebraska State College System
  - Chadron State College
  - Peru State College
  - Wayne State College
- University of Nebraska system
  - University of Nebraska–Lincoln (Nebraska or UNL) (Lincoln – flagship/main campus)
  - University of Nebraska at Kearney (UNK)
  - University of Nebraska Omaha (UNO)
  - University of Nebraska Medical Center (UNMC)

== Nevada ==
- Nevada System of Higher Education
  - University of Nevada, Reno (UNR) (Reno – flagship/main campus)
  - College of Southern Nevada (community college; in addition to associate's degrees, offers a bachelor's degree program)
  - Great Basin College (community college; in addition to associate degrees, offers a few bachelor's degrees)
  - Nevada State University
  - University of Nevada, Las Vegas (UNLV)
  - Western Nevada College (community college; in addition to associate degrees, offers a bachelor's degree program)
  - Truckee Meadows Community College (Community college located in Northern Reno. Offers a variety of associate degree programs, as well as bachelor's degrees, which are provided through a partnership with Sierra Nevada College)

== New Hampshire ==
- University System of New Hampshire
  - Keene State College
  - Plymouth State University
  - University of New Hampshire (UNH) (Durham – flagship/main campus)

== New Jersey ==
- The College of New Jersey
- Kean University
  - Kean Jersey City
- Montclair State University
- New Jersey Institute of Technology (NJIT)
- Ramapo College
- Rowan University
- Rutgers University system
  - Rutgers University–New Brunswick (Rutgers) (New Brunswick and Piscataway – flagship/main campus)
  - Rutgers University–Newark
  - Rutgers University–Camden
  - Rutgers Health
- Stockton University
- Thomas Edison State University
- William Paterson University of New Jersey

== New Mexico ==
- Eastern New Mexico University (ENMU)
- University of New Mexico (New Mexico or UNM)
- New Mexico Highlands University
- New Mexico State University (NMSU)
- New Mexico Institute of Mining and Technology (New Mexico Tech)
- Northern New Mexico College
- Western New Mexico University (WNMU)

== New York ==
- State University of New York (SUNY) system
  - University centers
    - The State University of New York at Buffalo (University at Buffalo, UBuffalo)
    - University at Albany (Albany, UAlbany)
    - Binghamton University (Binghamton)
    - Stony Brook University (Stony Brook)
  - Other doctoral-granting institutions
    - State University of New York Downstate Health Sciences University
    - State University of New York Upstate Medical University
    - State University of New York Polytechnic Institute (SUNY Poly)
    - New York State College of Ceramics (contract college at Alfred University)
    - College of Agriculture and Life Sciences (contract college at Cornell University)
    - College of Human Ecology (contract college at Cornell University)
    - College of Veterinary Medicine (contract college at Cornell University)
    - School of Industrial and Labor Relations (contract college at Cornell University)
    - State University of New York College of Environmental Science and Forestry
    - State University of New York College of Optometry
  - Community colleges
    - SUNY Adirondack
    - SUNY Broome Community College
    - Cayuga Community College
    - Clinton Community College
    - Columbia–Greene Community College
    - Corning Community College
    - Dutchess Community College
    - SUNY Erie
    - Finger Lakes Community College
    - Fulton–Montgomery Community College
    - Genesee Community College
    - Herkimer County Community College
    - Hudson Valley Community College
    - Jamestown Community College
    - Jefferson Community College
    - Mohawk Valley Community College
    - Monroe Community College
    - Nassau Community College
    - SUNY Niagara
    - North Country Community College
    - Onondaga Community College
    - SUNY Orange
    - Rockland Community College
    - Schenectady County Community College
    - Suffolk County Community College
    - SUNY Sullivan
    - Tompkins Cortland Community College
    - SUNY Ulster
    - Westchester Community College
  - Comprehensive colleges
    - Buffalo State University
    - Empire State University
    - State University of New York Brockport (SUNY Brockport)
    - State University of New York at Cortland (SUNY Cortland)
    - State University of New York at Fredonia (SUNY Fredonia)
    - State University of New York at Geneseo (SUNY Geneseo)
    - State University of New York at New Paltz (SUNY New Paltz)
    - State University of New York at Old Westbury (SUNY Old Westbury)
    - State University of New York at Oneonta (SUNY Oneonta)
    - State University of New York at Oswego (SUNY Oswego)
    - State University of New York at Plattsburgh (SUNY Plattsburgh)
    - State University of New York at Potsdam (SUNY Potsdam)
    - State University of New York at Purchase (SUNY Purchase)
  - Technology colleges
    - Alfred State College
    - Fashion Institute of Technology (FIT) (a SUNY community college; in addition to associate's degrees, also offers bachelor's and master's degrees)
    - State University of New York at Canton (SUNY Canton)
    - State University of New York at Cobleskill (SUNY Cobleskill)
    - State University of New York at Delhi (SUNY Delhi)
    - State University of New York at Farmingdale (SUNY Farmingdale)
    - State University of New York Maritime College (SUNY Maritime)
    - State University of New York at Morrisville (SUNY Morrisville)
- City University of New York (CUNY) system
  - Colleges
    - Baruch College
    - Brooklyn College
    - City College of New York
    - College of Staten Island
    - Hunter College
    - John Jay College of Criminal Justice
    - Lehman College
    - Medgar Evers College
    - New York City College of Technology
    - Queens College
    - York College
  - Community Colleges
    - Bronx Community College
    - Borough of Manhattan Community College
    - Guttman Community College
    - Hostos Community College
    - Kingsborough Community College
    - LaGuardia Community College
    - Queensborough Community College
  - Graduate and professional schools
    - CUNY Graduate Center
    - CUNY Graduate School of Journalism
    - CUNY School of Law
    - CUNY School of Labor and Urban Studies
    - CUNY School of Professional Studies
    - CUNY School of Public Health and Health Policy
    - William E. Macaulay Honors College

== North Carolina ==
- University of North Carolina system
  - Appalachian State University (Appalachian State or App State)
  - East Carolina University (ECU)
  - Elizabeth City State University (ECSU)
  - Fayetteville State University (FSU)
  - North Carolina A&T State University (North Carolina A&T)
  - North Carolina Central University (North Carolina Central or NCCU)
  - North Carolina State University (North Carolina State, NC State, NCSU)
  - University of North Carolina at Asheville (UNC Asheville or UNCA)
  - University of North Carolina at Chapel Hill (UNC Chapel Hill or UNC—flagship/main campus)
  - University of North Carolina at Charlotte (UNC Charlotte or Charlotte)
  - University of North Carolina at Greensboro (UNC Greensboro or UNCG)
  - University of North Carolina at Pembroke (UNC Pembroke)
  - University of North Carolina Wilmington (UNC Wilmington or UNCW)
  - University of North Carolina School of the Arts (UNC School of the Arts)
  - Western Carolina University (WCU)
  - Winston-Salem State University (WSSU)
  - University of North Carolina Press (UNC Press)
  - PBS North Carolina
  - North Carolina Arboretum

== North Dakota ==
- North Dakota University System
  - Universities
    - Dickinson State University
    - Mayville State University
    - Minot State University
    - University of North Dakota (UND) (Grand Forks)
    - North Dakota State University (North Dakota State or NDSU)
    - Valley City State University
  - Community Colleges
    - Bismarck State College
    - Dakota College at Bottineau
    - Lake Region State College
    - North Dakota State College of Science
    - Williston State College

== Northern Mariana Islands ==
- Northern Marianas College (community college; offers associate and Bachelor of Science degrees)

== Ohio ==
- University System of Ohio
  - Universities
    - University of Akron (Akron)
    - Bowling Green State University (BGSU)
    - Central State University
    - University of Cincinnati
    - Cleveland State University
    - Kent State University
    - Miami University
    - Northeast Ohio Medical University
    - Ohio State University
    - Ohio University
    - Shawnee State University
    - University of Toledo
    - Wright State University
    - Youngstown State University
  - Community Colleges
    - Belmont College
    - Central Ohio Technical College
    - Cincinnati State Technical and Community College
    - Clark State College
    - Columbus State Community College
    - Cuyahoga Community College
    - Edison State Community College
    - Hocking College
    - Lakeland Community College
    - Lorain County Community College
    - Marion Technical College
    - North Central State College
    - Northwest State Community College
    - Owens Community College
    - Rhodes State College
    - University of Rio Grande
    - Sinclair Community College
    - Southern State Community College
    - Stark State College
    - Terra State Community College
    - Washington State College of Ohio
    - Zane State College

== Oklahoma ==
- Cameron University
- East Central University
- Langston University
- Northeastern State University
- Northwestern Oklahoma State University
- University of Oklahoma system
  - University of Oklahoma (Oklahoma) (Norman – flagship/main campus)
  - University of Oklahoma-Tulsa Schusterman Center
  - University of Oklahoma Health Sciences Center
- Oklahoma Panhandle State University
- Oklahoma State University System
  - Oklahoma State University–Stillwater (Oklahoma State) (Stillwater – flagship/main campus)
  - Oklahoma State University Center for Health Sciences
  - Oklahoma State University Institute of Technology
  - Oklahoma State University–Oklahoma City
  - Oklahoma State University–Tulsa
- Rogers State University
- University of Science and Arts of Oklahoma
- Southeastern Oklahoma State University
- Southwestern Oklahoma State University
- University of Central Oklahoma

== Oregon ==
- Eastern Oregon University (EOU)
- Oregon Health & Science University (OHSU)
- Oregon Institute of Technology (Oregon Tech or OIT)
- Oregon State University (Oregon State or OSU)
  - Oregon State University–Cascades (OSU Cascades)
- Portland State University (Portland State or PSU)
- Southern Oregon University (SOU)
- University of Oregon (Oregon or UO)
- Western Oregon University (WOU)

== Pennsylvania ==
Pennsylvania State System of Higher Education (PaSSHE)

The 14 universities in PaSSHE are state-owned. They are directly governed by gubernatorial appointees sitting on the PaSSHE Board of Governors. Each university also has an independent Council of Trustees appointed by the Commonwealth's governor.

- State-owned universities:
  - Commonwealth University of Pennsylvania
    - Commonwealth University-Bloomsburg
    - Commonwealth University-Lock Haven
    - Commonwealth University-Mansfield
  - Pennsylvania Western University
    - PennWest California
    - PennWest Clarion
    - PennWest Edinboro
  - Cheyney University
  - East Stroudsburg University
  - Indiana University of Pennsylvania (IUP)
  - Kutztown University
  - Millersville University
  - Shippensburg University
  - Slippery Rock University
  - West Chester University

Commonwealth System of Higher Education

Universities of the Commonwealth System of Higher Education receive public funds and reduce tuition for residents of Pennsylvania. Gubernatorial appointees are always a minority of their respective governing boards. Each university is a multi-campus institution throughout the state.

- State-related institutions:
  - Lincoln University
  - Pennsylvania State University
    - Penn State University Park (PSU-University Park, administrative hub)
    - Penn State Abington (PSU-Abington)
    - Penn State Altoona (PSU-Altoona)
    - Penn State Berks (PSU-Berks)
    - Penn State Beaver (PSU-Beaver)
    - Penn State Brandywine (PSU-Brandywine)
    - Penn State College of Medicine
    - Penn State Dickinson Law
    - Penn State DuBois (PSU-DuBois)
    - Penn State Erie, The Behrend College (PSU-Erie or Behrend)
    - Penn State Fayette (PSU-Fayette)
    - Penn State Great Valley (PSU-Great Valley)
    - Penn State Greater Allegheny (PSU-Greater Allegheny)
    - Penn State Harrisburg (PSU-Harrisburg)
    - Penn State Hazleton (PSU-Hazleton)
    - Penn State Lehigh Valley (PSU-Lehigh Valley)
    - Penn State Mont Alto (PSU-Mont Alto)
    - Penn State New Kensington (PSU-New Kensington)
    - Penn State Schuylkill (PSU-Schuylkill)
    - Penn State Scranton (PSU-Scranton)
    - Penn State Shenango (PSU-Shenango)
    - Penn State Wilkes-Barre (PSU-Wilkes-Barre)
    - Penn State Williamsport
    - Penn State World Campus
    - Penn State York (PSU-York)
  - Temple University
    - Temple University (Temple or TU)
    - Temple University Ambler (TU-Ambler)
    - Temple University, Japan Campus (TUJ)
    - Temple University Rome (Temple Rome)
    - Temple University Health Sciences Campus
    - Temple University Podiatric Medicine Campus
    - Temple University Center City Campus
    - Temple University Harrisburg
  - University of Pittsburgh
    - University of Pittsburgh (Pittsburgh or Pitt)
    - University of Pittsburgh at Bradford
    - University of Pittsburgh at Greensburg
    - University of Pittsburgh at Johnstown
    - University of Pittsburgh at Titusville

== Puerto Rico ==
- University of Puerto Rico system
  - University of Puerto Rico, Río Piedras Campus (UPR-RP) (Rio Piedras – flagship/main campus)
  - University of Puerto Rico at Mayagüez (UPRM)
  - University of Puerto Rico at Arecibo (UPRA)
  - University of Puerto Rico at Bayamón (UPRB)
  - University of Puerto Rico at Carolina (UPRC)
  - University of Puerto Rico at Cayey (UPR-Cayey)
  - University of Puerto Rico at Humacao (UPRH)
  - University of Puerto Rico at Aguadilla (UPRAG)
  - University of Puerto Rico at Ponce (UPRP)
  - University of Puerto Rico at Utuado (UPRU)
  - University of Puerto Rico, Medical Sciences Campus (UPR-CM)
- Escuela de Artes Plásticas y Diseño de Puerto Rico
- Conservatory of Music of Puerto Rico

== Rhode Island ==
- Rhode Island College (RIC)
- University of Rhode Island

== South Carolina ==
- The Citadel
- Clemson University
- Coastal Carolina University (Coastal Carolina or CCU)
- College of Charleston (Charleston or CofC)
- Francis Marion University
- Lander University
- Medical University of South Carolina
- University of South Carolina System
  - University of South Carolina (Carolina, USC, or SCar) (Columbia – flagship/main campus)
  - University of South Carolina Aiken (USC-Aiken)
  - University of South Carolina Beaufort (USC-Beaufort)
    - Palmetto College
      - University of South Carolina Lancaster (USC-Lancaster)
      - University of South Carolina Salkehatchie (USC-Salkehatchie)
      - University of South Carolina Sumter (USC-Sumter)
      - University of South Carolina Union (USC-Union)
  - University of South Carolina Upstate (USC-Upstate or Upstate)
- South Carolina State University (SCSU)
- Winthrop University (WU)

== South Dakota ==
- Black Hills State University
- Dakota State University
- Northern State University
- University of South Dakota (South Dakota or USD)
- South Dakota School of Mines and Technology (South Dakota School of Mines, South Dakota Mines, or SDSM&T, pronounced "SDSM and T")
- South Dakota State University (South Dakota State or SDSU)

== Tennessee ==
- Austin Peay State University (Austin Peay or APSU)
- East Tennessee State University (ETSU)
- Middle Tennessee State University (MTSU)
- Tennessee State University (TSU)
- Tennessee Technological University (Tennessee Tech or TTU)
- University of Memphis (U of M) (Memphis – flagship/main campus)
- University of Tennessee system (UT, UTC, and UT Martin are primary campuses of the UT System, whereas the UTHSC, UT Southern, and the Space Institute are three other educational campuses.)
  - University of Tennessee at Knoxville (UT Knoxville, UTK, or UT) (Knoxville – flagship/main campus)
  - University of Tennessee at Chattanooga (UT Chattanooga or UTC)
  - University of Tennessee at Martin (UT Martin or UTM)
  - University of Tennessee Health Science Center (UTHSC or UT Medical School) (Memphis)
  - University of Tennessee Southern (formerly Martin Methodist College) (Pulaski)
  - University of Tennessee Space Institute (UT Space Institute) (Tullahoma)

== Texas ==
- University of Houston System
  - University of Houston (Houston – flagship/main campus)
  - University of Houston–Clear Lake
  - University of Houston–Downtown
- University of North Texas System
  - University of North Texas (Denton – flagship/main campus)
  - University of North Texas at Dallas
  - University of North Texas Health Science Center
- The University of Texas System
  - Academic institutions
    - The University of Texas at Arlington
    - The University of Texas at Austin (Austin – flagship/main campus)
    - The University of Texas at Dallas
    - The University of Texas at El Paso
    - The University of Texas Permian Basin
    - The University of Texas Rio Grande Valley
    - The University of Texas at San Antonio
    - The University of Texas at Tyler
    - Stephen F. Austin State University
  - Health institutions
    - MD Anderson Cancer Center
    - University of Texas Medical Branch
    - University of Texas Southwestern Medical Center
    - University of Texas Health Science Center at Houston (UTHealth)
    - University of Texas Health Science Center at San Antonio
- Texas A&M University System
  - Texas A&M University (Texas A&M or A&M) (College Station, Galveston, Doha – flagship/main campus)
  - East Texas A&M University
  - Prairie View A&M University
  - Tarleton State University
  - Texas A&M International University
  - Texas A&M University–Central Texas
  - Texas A&M University–Corpus Christi
  - Texas A&M University–Kingsville
  - Texas A&M University–San Antonio
  - Texas A&M University–Texarkana
  - Texas A&M University–Victoria
  - West Texas A&M University
  - Texas A&M AgriLife Research
  - Texas A&M AgriLife Extension Service
  - Texas A&M Engineering Experiment Station
  - Texas A&M Engineering Extension Service
  - Texas A&M Forest Service
  - Texas A&M Transportation Institute
  - Texas Veterinary Medical Diagnostic Laboratory
  - Texas Division of Emergency Management
- Texas Southern University
- Texas State University System
  - Lamar University
  - Sam Houston State University
  - Sul Ross State University
  - Texas State University
  - Lamar Institute of Technology
  - Lamar State College–Orange
  - Lamar State College–Port Arthur
- Texas Tech University System
  - Academic institutions
    - Angelo State University
    - Midwestern State University
    - Texas Tech University (Texas Tech) (Lubbock – flagship/main campus)
  - Health institutions
    - Texas Tech University Health Sciences Center
    - Texas Tech University Health Sciences Center El Paso
- Texas Woman's University System (https://twu.edu/news/2021/bill-establishing-twu-system-becomes-law/) -The system was created in 2021. Texas Woman's University in Denton is currently the only system component; however, the establishing legislation anticipates the university's branch campuses becoming standalone institutions within the system.
  - Texas Woman's University
    - Dallas branch
    - Houston branch

== Utah ==
- Utah System of Higher Education
  - Snow College (community college; in addition to associate degrees, offers a few bachelor's degrees)
  - Southern Utah University (Southern Utah or SUU)
  - University of Utah (Utah, U of U, or UU)
  - Utah State University (Utah State or USU)
    - Utah State University Eastern (USUE)
  - Utah Tech University (Utah Tech or UT)
  - Utah Valley University (Utah Valley or UVU)
  - Weber State University (Weber State)

== Vermont ==
- Vermont State Colleges (Listed below are the state universities.)
  - Vermont State University Castleton, Johnson, Lyndon, and Randolph
  - Community College of Vermont
- University of Vermont (UVM)

== Virginia ==
- Christopher Newport University (CNU)
- Virginia Health Sciences (EVMS)
- George Mason University (George Mason, GMU, or Mason)
- James Madison University (JMU or James Madison)
- Longwood University
- University of Mary Washington (Mary Washington, Mary Wash, or UMW)
- Norfolk State University
- Old Dominion University (Old Dominion or ODU)
- Radford University
- University of Virginia (UVA)
- University of Virginia's College at Wise (UVA at Wise or UVA-Wise)
- Virginia Commonwealth University (VCU)
- Virginia Military Institute (VMI)
- Virginia Polytechnic Institute and State University (Virginia Tech or VT)
- Virginia State University (VSU)
- The College of William & Mary (William and Mary, W&M)

== Virgin Islands ==
- University of the Virgin Islands system
  - University of the Virgin Islands – St. Croix campus (UVI-St. Croix)
  - University of the Virgin Islands – St. Thomas campus (UVI-St. Thomas)

== Washington ==
- Central Washington University (CWU)
- Eastern Washington University (EWU)
- Evergreen State College
- University of Washington (campuses in Seattle, Bothell, and Tacoma)
- Washington State University System
  - Washington State University (Pullman – flagship/main campus)
  - Washington State University Everett
  - Washington State University Spokane
  - Washington State University Tri-Cities
  - Washington State University Vancouver
  - Washington State University Global Campus
- Western Washington University (WWU)

== West Virginia ==
- Bluefield State University
- Concord University
- Fairmont State University
- Glenville State University
- Marshall University
- Shepherd University
- West Liberty University
- West Virginia University at Parkersburg
- West Virginia University system
  - West Virginia University (WVU) (Morgantown – flagship/main campus)
  - Potomac State College of West Virginia University (Potomac State College or Potomac State) (community college; in addition to associate's degrees, offers a bachelor's degree program)
  - West Virginia University Institute of Technology (WVU Tech or West Virginia Tech)
- West Virginia School of Osteopathic Medicine
- West Virginia State University (WVSU)

== Wisconsin ==
- University of Wisconsin System
  - University of Wisconsin–Madison (Wisconsin) (Madison – flagship/main campus)
  - University of Wisconsin–Eau Claire
  - University of Wisconsin–Green Bay
  - University of Wisconsin–La Crosse
  - University of Wisconsin–Milwaukee
  - University of Wisconsin–Oshkosh
  - University of Wisconsin–Parkside
  - University of Wisconsin–Platteville
  - University of Wisconsin–River Falls
  - University of Wisconsin–Stevens Point
  - University of Wisconsin–Stout
  - University of Wisconsin–Superior
  - University of Wisconsin–Whitewater

== Wyoming ==
- University of Wyoming

== See also ==
- Lists of American colleges and universities
