= UPR =

UPR may refer to:

- Unfolded protein response, a biological response in the "endoplasmic reticulum" when some proteins did not properly fold
- Union Pacific Railroad, a freight railroad based in Omaha, Nebraska.
- Universal Periodic Review of the United Nations Human Rights Council
- Unconditional positive regard, one of the three core conditions of "person-centered therapy"
- Utah Public Radio, a radio station, part of the College of Humanities and Social Sciences at Utah State University

== Politics ==
- Unia Polityki Realnej, a political party in Poland
- Popular Republican Union (disambiguation) (French: Union Populaire Républicaine, UPR)
- Progressive Union for Renewal (French: Union progressiste pour le renouveau, UPR), a political party in Benin
- Union for Progress and Renewal, a political party in Guinea
- Ukrainian People's Republic (1917–21), former state in Eastern Europe
- Unitary parliamentary republic, a form of unitary states

== University ==
- University of Palangka Raya, the public university in Palangkaraya, Indonesia
- University of Puerto Rico, the public university system of Puerto Rico, or one of its 11 campuses:
  - University of Puerto Rico, Medical Sciences Campus
  - University of Puerto Rico at Aguadilla
  - University of Puerto Rico at Arecibo
  - University of Puerto Rico at Bayamón
  - University of Puerto Rico at Carolina
  - University of Puerto Rico at Cayey
  - University of Puerto Rico at Humacao
  - University of Puerto Rico at Mayagüez
  - University of Puerto Rico at Ponce
  - University of Puerto Rico at Rio Piedras
  - University of Puerto Rico at Utuado
