= Mueve tu Universidad =

Puerto Rican fundraising program

Move your University
- Mueve tu Universidad
- Type of project: Fundraising
- Products: Motor vehicle registration
- Country: Puerto Rico
- Launched: 26 December 2018; 7 years ago San Juan, Puerto Rico
- Status: Active

Mueve tu Universidad

Legislative Assembly of Puerto Rico
- Long title: To order the Secretary of the Department of Transportation and Public Works to prepare and issue annually a commemorative label of the University of Puerto Rico and its eleven (11) institutional units, and require the Secretary of the Treasury, in coordination with the Secretary of Transportation and Public Works and the service providers for the collection of label payments, establish a procedure that allows citizens during the period in which the commemorative labels of the University of Puerto Rico and its institutional units are issued to carry out, together with the payment of the label, a donation in the amount of one dollar ($ 1.00), five dollars ($ 5.00) or ten dollars ($ 10.00), to be used exclusively and in its entirety to the General Fund of the University of Puerto Rico.
- Citation: RCS0076
- Territorial extent: Puerto Rico
- Enacted by: Senate of Puerto Rico
- Enacted by: June 30, 2017
- Signed by: Thomas Rivera Schatz and Carlos Johnny Méndez
- Signed: July 5, 2017
- Effective: July 6, 2017

Legislative history

Initiating chamber: Senate of Puerto Rico
- Introduced by: Miguel Romero
- Introduced: February 28, 2017
- First reading: February 28, 2017

Final stages
- Reported from conference committee: June 23, 2017
- Conference committee bill passed by Senate of Puerto Rico: June 30, 2017
- Status: In force

Mueve tu Universidad (or Move your University) is a fundraising program established in 2018 to provide funds to the University of Puerto Rico (UPR) by allowing the option of donating money when paying the annual motor vehicle registration fee or car tag (marbete).

== History ==
=== Centennial edition ===
For the University of Puerto Rico's centennial, then-president Antonio García Padilla, and then-Secretary of Transportation and Public Works, Fernando E. Fagundo, unveiled the car tag at the San Juan Botanical Garden's pergola on January 27, 2003. Based on DTOP's estimate, 2.2 million vehicles would bear the car tag, which was the first in Puerto Rico history to bear a barcode. The design elements were the UPR logo, the years 1903-2003 "in red over a white and cream background," on the bottom section was the barcode and over the code, the number 2004. During the unveilling ceremony, García Padilla glued a facsimile of the car tag on a vehicle used by the botanical garden's personnel. Fagundo, a graduate of the Mayagüez campus, presented García Padilla with "an amplified copy, signed, as a reminder of the centennial year."

=== Development ===
On February 28, 2017, then-senator Miguel Romero Lugo submitted a joint resolution that would allow the option of donating $1, $5, or $10 to the UPR when renewing their motor vehicle registration, which would also bear a design inspired by the UPR and its eleven campuses. It was referred to the Senate's Commission on Innovation, Telecommunications, Urbanism and Infrastructure, presided by then-senator Miguel A. Laureano Correa. At the committee's April 7 public hearing Carlos M. Contreras Aponte, Secretary of Transportation and Public Works, and a representative of the Department of Treasury, who promised that the Treasury would annually report on the funds raised to the Legislative Assembly, expressed their support. Laureano Correa also expressed his support, as the resolution was "a donation and not a tax." After the public hearing, Romero Lugo could not provide an estimate of how much will be raised by this program. For his part, Contreras Aponte stated "that between 2 to 2.3 million vehicles pay car tags annually in Puerto Rico." On occasion of the measure being approved by the Senate on May 16, Romero Lugo stated that "donations could amount to more than $100 million." Even though the initial version of the resolution was approved by the Senate unanimously, it received several criticisms. Then-senator Larry Seilhamer Rodríguez, lamented that even though it was a praiseworthy project it was similar to another scheme from 2012 in which he was involved, whereby a dollar would be donated to the Center for Comprehensive Development and Training for Independent Living for children and youth on the autism spectrum. This initiative was not successful since, Seilhamer Rodríguez claimed "DTOP made absolutely no efforts to guide, promote, sponsor, educate, or give that alternative [of donating]." Then-senator Juan Dalmau Ramírez also criticized the measure, since, he explained, the UPR was having its budget cut by the Fiscal Management and Oversight Board under PROMESA, even though it generated almost 50% of its own expenses. Additionally, on the same day the UPR was subject a single $5,000 fine and an additional $1,000 a day fine for "maintaining an impasse that persists according to the negotiations that are taking place between the administration and the students."

With the support of the University of Puerto Rico's National Student Conference (CEN), which was formed during the 2017 strikes and had held meetings with then-governor Ricardo Rosselló Nevares during March, the resolution was approved on July 6, 2017. On Boxing Day 2018, Rosselló Nevares announced the "Move your University" program through a press release. The "car tag" could be bought at more than 900 (though by December 2020 this had been reduced to 328) places on the island, including bank branches, cooperatives and inspection centers that existed then. UPR president Jorge Haddock Acevedo, called the campaign "a calling for all to become part of the transformation of the [UPR]." Contreras Aponte, a graduate from the Mayagüez campus, highlighted that December and January are the months with the highest sales of car tags at an average of 220,000 each month.

From January 2019 till 2031 the vehicle registrations would have a UPR commemorative artwork, starting with the UPR and then a different campus every year.

On May 17, 2018, then-senator Luis Daniel Muñiz Cortés presented a similar Senate joint resolution by which the Department of Transportation and Public Works (DTOP) would issue motor vehicle registrations bearing designs of the Porta del Sol for 2020, the mundillo industry in Moca for 2021, and from 2022 onwards with the UPR and its eleven campuses. This joint resolution was not recommended for approval by the committee.

The donation is not included cost of the car tag, by which the driver renewing the car registration has to both "communicate their intention of donating and authorize the additional charging."

=== List of Designs ===
Year	Image	Campus	Founded	Colors	Symbols	Ref.
2020		UPR	1966	Orange and white	Some versions have the UPR logo and others the UPR seal.	
2021		Río Piedras	1903	Red and brown	Franklin Delano Roosevelt Tower.	
2022		Mayagüez	1911	Green, white and grey	Portico and Tarzán.	
2023		Medical Sciences	1949			
2024		Humacao	1962			
2025		Arecibo	1967			
2026		Cayey	1967			
2027		Ponce	1969			
2028		Bayamón	1971			
2029		Aguadilla	1972			
2030		Carolina	1973			
2031		Utuado	1978			
