= List of University of Puerto Rico campuses =

The University of Puerto Rico (UPR) is the main public university system of Puerto Rico and a government-owned corporation of Puerto Rico. It consists of 11 campuses and has approximately 58,000 students and 5,300 faculty members. UPR has the largest and most diverse academic offerings in Puerto Rico and the Caribbean, with 472 academic programs of which 32 lead to a doctorate.

== Campuses ==
| Campus | City | Year established | Enrollment |
|---|---|---|---|
| University of Puerto Rico, Medical Sciences Campus | San Juan | 1966 | 2,657 |
| University of Puerto Rico at Aguadilla | Aguadilla | 1972 | 2,973 |
| University of Puerto Rico at Arecibo | Arecibo | 1967 | 3,757 |
| University of Puerto Rico at Bayamón | Bayamón | 1971 | 5,075 |
| University of Puerto Rico at Carolina | Carolina | 1974 | 3,994 |
| University of Puerto Rico at Cayey | Cayey | 1967 | 3,817 |
| University of Puerto Rico at Humacao | Humacao | 1962 | 3,495 |
| University of Puerto Rico at Mayagüez | Mayagüez | 1911 | 11,838 |
| University of Puerto Rico at Ponce | Ponce | 1970 | 3,120 |
| University of Puerto Rico at Río Piedras | San Juan | 1903 | 15,441 |
| University of Puerto Rico at Utuado | Utuado | 1979 | 1,559 |

== See also ==
- School of Tropical Medicine
- 2010 University of Puerto Rico Strike
