= List of members of the American Association of State Colleges and Universities =

This is a list of members of the American Association of State Colleges and Universities.

- Adams State University
- Alabama Agricultural and Mechanical University
- Alabama State University
- University of Alaska Anchorage
- University of Alaska Southeast
- Albany State University
- Alcorn State University
- Alfred State College
- Arizona Board of Regents
- University of Arkansas–Fort Smith
- University of Arkansas at Little Rock
- University of Arkansas at Monticello
- Arkansas State University
- Arkansas Tech University
- Athens State University
- Atlantic University College
- Auburn University at Montgomery
- Austin Peay State University
- Ball State University
- Baruch College
- Bemidji State University
- Black Hills State University
- Bluefield State University
- Bowie State University
- Bowling Green State University
- Bridgewater State University
- Brooklyn College
- Buffalo State University
- Cal Poly Maritime Academy
- California Polytechnic State University
- California State Polytechnic University, Humboldt
- California State Polytechnic University, Pomona
- California State University
- California State University San Marcos
- California State University, Bakersfield
- California State University, Channel Islands
- California State University, Chico
- California State University, Dominguez Hills
- California State University, East Bay
- California State University, Fresno
- California State University, Fullerton
- California State University, Long Beach
- California State University, Los Angeles
- California State University, Monterey Bay
- California State University, Northridge
- California State University, Sacramento
- California State University, San Bernardino
- California State University, Stanislaus
- Cameron University
- University of Central Arkansas
- Central Connecticut State University
- University of Central Florida
- Central Michigan University
- University of Central Missouri
- University of Central Oklahoma
- Central State University
- Central Washington University
- Chadron State College
- College of Charleston
- Cheyney University
- Chicago State University
- Christopher Newport University
- The Citadel
- City College of New York
- City University of New York
- Clayton State University
- Clemson University
- Cleveland State University
- Coastal Carolina University
- The College of New Jersey
- College of Staten Island
- Colorado Mesa University
- Colorado State University–Pueblo
- Columbus State University
- Commonwealth University-Bloomsburg
- Commonwealth University-Mansfield
- Concord University
- Connecticut State University System
- Coppin State University
- Dakota State University
- Dalton State College
- Delaware State University
- Delta State University
- Dickinson State University
- University of the District of Columbia
- East Carolina University
- East Central University
- East Stroudsburg University
- East Tennessee State University
- East Texas A&M University
- Eastern Connecticut State University
- Eastern Illinois University
- Eastern Kentucky University
- Eastern Michigan University
- Eastern New Mexico University
- Eastern Oregon University
- Eastern Washington University
- Elizabeth City State University
- Empire State University
- Emporia State University
- Fairmont State University
- Farmingdale State College
- Fayetteville State University
- Ferris State University
- Fitchburg State University
- Florida A&M University
- Florida Atlantic University
- Florida Gulf Coast University
- Fort Hays State University
- Fort Lewis College
- Fort Valley State University
- Framingham State University
- Francis Marion University
- Frederick Community College
- Frostburg State University
- George Mason University
- Georgia Board of Regents
- Georgia College & State University
- Georgia Southern University
- Georgia Southwestern State University
- Glenville State University
- Governors State University
- Grambling State University
- Grand Valley State University
- Great Falls College Montana State University
- University of Guam
- Harris–Stowe State University
- Helena College University of Montana
- Henderson State University
- University of Houston–Clear Lake
- University of Houston–Downtown
- Howard University
- Hunter College
- University of Illinois at Springfield
- Illinois State University
- Indiana State University
- Indiana University Columbus
- Indiana University East
- Indiana University Indianapolis
- Indiana University Kokomo
- Indiana University Northwest
- Indiana University of Pennsylvania
- Indiana University South Bend
- Indiana University Southeast
- Jackson State University
- Jacksonville State University
- James Madison University
- John Jay College of Criminal Justice
- Kean Jersey City
- Keene State College
- Kennesaw State University
- Kent State University at Stark
- Kentucky State University
- Kutztown University
- Lake Superior State University
- Lander University
- Lehman College
- Lewis–Clark State College
- Lincoln University (Missouri)
- Commonwealth University-Lock Haven
- Longwood University
- University of Louisiana at Lafayette
- University of Louisiana at Monroe
- Louisiana Board of Regents
- Louisiana State University in Shreveport
- Louisiana Tech University
- University of Maine at Machias
- McNeese State University
- University of Maine at Augusta
- University of Maine at Farmington
- University of Maine at Fort Kent
- University of Maine at Presque Isle
- University of Mary Washington
- University of Massachusetts Amherst
- University of Massachusetts Boston
- Massachusetts College of Liberal Arts
- University of Massachusetts Dartmouth
- Mayville State University
- Medgar Evers College
- University of Memphis
- Metropolitan State University
- Metropolitan State University of Denver
- Michigan Technological University
- University of Michigan–Dearborn
- University of Michigan–Flint
- Middle Georgia State University
- Middle Tennessee State University
- Midwestern State University
- Millersville University
- Minnesota State Colleges and Universities System
- Minnesota State University Moorhead
- Minnesota State University, Mankato
- University of Minnesota Duluth
- Minot State University
- Mississippi University for Women
- Mississippi Valley State University
- Missouri Southern State University
- Missouri State University
- Missouri Western State University
- University of Missouri–St. Louis
- Montana State University Billings
- Montana State University–Northern
- Montana Technological University
- University of Montana Western
- Montclair State University
- University of Montevallo
- Morehead State University
- Morgan State University
- Murray State University
- University of Nebraska at Kearney
- Nebraska State College System
- Nevada State University
- University of Nevada, Las Vegas
- New College of Florida
- New Mexico Highlands University
- Nicholls State University
- University of North Alabama
- North Carolina Agricultural and Technical State University
- University of North Carolina at Asheville
- University of North Carolina at Charlotte
- University of North Carolina at Pembroke
- North Dakota University System
- University of North Dakota
- University of North Florida
- University of North Texas
- Northeastern Illinois University
- Northeastern State University
- Northern Arizona University
- University of Northern Colorado
- Northern Illinois University
- University of Northern Iowa
- Northern Kentucky University
- Northern Michigan University
- Northern State University
- Northwest Missouri State University
- Northwestern Oklahoma State University
- Northwestern State University
- Oakland University
- Ohio State University, Newark Campus
- Oklahoma Panhandle State University
- Oklahoma State Regents for Higher Education
- Old Dominion University
- Oregon Institute of Technology
- Penn State Altoona
- Penn State Erie, The Behrend College
- Penn State Graduate School
- Penn State Harrisburg
- Pennsylvania State System of Higher Education
- Pennsylvania State University
- PennWest Clarion
- PennWest California
- Peru State College
- Pittsburg State University
- University of Pittsburgh at Bradford
- University of Pittsburgh at Greensburg
- University of Pittsburgh at Johnstown
- State University of New York at Plattsburgh
- Plymouth State University
- Portland State University
- Prairie View A&M University
- University of Puerto Rico at Arecibo
- University of Puerto Rico at Bayamón
- University of Puerto Rico at Cayey
- University of Puerto Rico at Mayagüez
- University of Puerto Rico, Río Piedras Campus
- University of Puerto Rico
- State University of New York at Purchase
- Purdue University
- Purdue University Fort Wayne
- Purdue University Northwest
- Queens College, City University of New York
- Radford University
- Ramapo College
- Rhode Island College
- Rogers State University
- Rowan University
- Saginaw Valley State University
- St. Cloud State University
- Salem State University
- Salisbury University
- Sam Houston State University
- San Diego State University
- San Francisco State University
- San Jose State University
- Savannah State University
- Shawnee State University
- Shepherd University
- Shippensburg University
- Slippery Rock University
- Sonoma State University
- University of South Alabama
- South Carolina State University
- University of South Carolina Aiken
- University of South Carolina Beaufort
- University of South Carolina Upstate
- South Dakota Board of Regents
- South Dakota School of Mines and Technology
- University of South Dakota
- Southeast Missouri State University
- Southeastern Louisiana University
- Southeastern Oklahoma State University
- Southern Arkansas University
- Southern Connecticut State University
- Southern Illinois University
- Southern Illinois University Carbondale
- Southern Illinois University Edwardsville
- University of Southern Indiana
- University of Southern Maine
- University of Southern Mississippi
- Southern Oregon University
- Southern Polytechnic State University
- Southern University at New Orleans
- Southern Utah University
- Southwest Minnesota State University
- Southwestern Oklahoma State University
- State University of New York
- State University of New York at Brockport
- State University of New York at Cobleskill
- State University of New York at Cortland
- State University of New York at Fredonia
- State University of New York at New Paltz
- State University of New York at Old Westbury
- State University of New York at Oneonta
- State University of New York at Oswego
- State University of New York at Potsdam
- Stephen F. Austin State University
- Stockton University
- Sul Ross State University
- Tarleton State University
- Tennessee Board of Regents
- Tennessee State University
- Tennessee Technological University
- University of Tennessee at Chattanooga
- University of Tennessee at Martin
- Texas A&M International University
- Texas A&M University–Corpus Christi
- Texas A&M University–Kingsville
- Texas A&M University–Texarkana
- Texas A&M University–Victoria
- University of Texas at San Antonio
- Texas Southern University
- Texas State University
- Texas State University System
- Texas Woman's University
- University of Texas Rio Grande Valley
- Thomas Edison State University
- University of Toledo
- Towson University
- Troy University
- Truman State University
- University of Alaska System
- University of Arkansas System
- University of Hawaiʻi
- University of Hawaiʻi at Hilo
- University of Hawaiʻi at West Oʻahu
- University of Louisiana System
- University of Maine System
- University of Maryland Eastern Shore
- University of Maryland Global Campus
- University of Maryland, Baltimore County
- University of Nebraska Omaha
- University of Nebraska system
- University of North Carolina at Greensboro
- University of North Carolina Wilmington
- North Georgia College & State University
- University of Puerto Rico at Carolina
- University of Puerto Rico at Humacao
- University of Science and Arts of Oklahoma
- University of Tennessee system
- University of Virginia's College at Wise
- University of West Florida
- University of Wisconsin System
- University of Wisconsin–Eau Claire
- University of Wisconsin–Green Bay
- University of Wisconsin–Oshkosh
- University of Wisconsin–Parkside
- University of Wisconsin–River Falls
- University of Wisconsin–Stout
- University of Wisconsin–Whitewater
- University System of Maryland
- University System of New Hampshire
- Utah System of Higher Education
- Utah Valley University
- Valdosta State University
- Valley City State University
- Vermont State Colleges
- Vermont State University Johnson
- Vermont State University Lyndon
- University of the Virgin Islands
- Washburn University
- University of Washington Tacoma
- Wayne State College
- Weber State University
- University of West Alabama
- West Chester University
- University of West Georgia
- West Texas A&M University
- West Virginia State University
- Western Carolina University
- Western Connecticut State University
- Western Kentucky University
- Western New Mexico University
- Western Oregon University
- Western State Colorado University
- Western Washington University
- Westfield State University
- William Paterson University
- Winona State University
- Winthrop University
- University of Wisconsin–La Crosse
- University of Wisconsin–Platteville
- University of Wisconsin–Stevens Point
- University of Wisconsin–Superior
- Worcester State University
- York College, City University of New York
