= Liga Atlética Interuniversitaria de Puerto Rico =

College athletics conference

- Formerly: Asociación Atlética Intercolegial (1929–1942)
- Conference: International University Sports Federation (FISU)
- Founded: February 2, 1929; 97 years ago
- Commissioner: Jorge Sosa
- Sports fielded: men's: 16; women's: 13
- No. of teams: 17
- Headquarters: San German, Puerto Rico
- Region: Puerto Rico
- Official website: laipr.org

The Liga Atlética Interuniversitaria, often abbreviated LAI, is a college athletic conference in the Caribbean archipelago of Puerto Rico with the former participation of the United States Virgin Islands.

The LAI is a non-profit organization whose main purpose is to regulate sports amongst its member institutions. The league was founded in 1929 by Cosme Beitía of the University of Puerto Rico at Rio Piedras, Charles Leker for the Interamerican University of Puerto Rico, and Luis Izquierdo Galo y José D. Morales from the University of Puerto Rico at Mayagüez. The league is best known for its flagship inter-collegiate sports event popularly called Las Justas which takes place yearly during the month of April, generally in the municipalities of Ponce or Mayagüez.

== History ==
The League began celebrating three sports events amongst its member institutions in 1929; Baseball, Basketball, and Athletics. For 40 years, the League's events were open to male athletes only. Women began competing in the league starting in the 1969–1970 academic year. Today, male athletes compete in some 16 events and female athletes in 13. Every year the league hosts the Justas de Atletismo y Festival Deportivo, their flagship sports competition event. For many years the event was held in San Juan, but in 1993 the event was moved to the city of Ponce. In 2010 the event was held in Mayagüez in preparation for the 2010 Central American and Caribbean Games. Games resumed in Ponce in 2011, and continued in Ponce in 2012.

The league is administered by a "Administrative Council" made up of the Deans of Students, Athletic Directors, and a student representative. There is also a "Cuerpo Rectoral" called the "Junta de Gobierno" made up of the Rectors and presidents of the member institutions. The "Junta de Gobierno" chooses an employee called "The Commissioner" who is appointed to act as executive officer of the LAI for a period of two years. The League is a founding member of International University Sports Federation.

== Sports ==
- men's baseball
- men's & women's basketball
- men's & women's cross country
- men's & women's judo
- men's & women's taekwondo
- men's & women's soccer
- men's & women's softball
- men's & women's swimming
- men's & women's table tennis
- men's & women's tennis
- men's & women's track and field
- men's & women's volleyball
- men's water polo
- men's & women's weightlifting
- men's wrestling

== Member schools ==
=== Current members ===
| Institution (English) | Institution (Spanish) | Acronym | Colors | Nickname | Location (Note: All cities are located in the Commonwealth of Puerto Rico.) | Joined | Affiliation | Enrollment (Note: Undergraduate) | Section |
|---|---|---|---|---|---|---|---|---|---|
| University of Puerto Rico at Río Piedras | Universidad de Puerto Rico en Río Piedras | UPRRP | | Gallitos & Jerezanas | San Juan | 1929 | Public | 18,653 | Beitia |
| University of Puerto Rico at Mayagüez | Universidad de Puerto Rico en Mayagüez | RUM | | Tarzanes & Juanas | Mayagüez | 1929 | Public | 13,148 | Mangual |
| Interamerican University of Puerto Rico | Universidad Interamericana de Puerto Rico | UIPR | | Tigres | San Germán | 1929 | Private | 50,000 | Mangual |
| Pontifical Catholic University of Puerto Rico | Pontificia Universidad Católica de Puerto Rico | PUCPR | | Pioneros | Ponce | 1954 | Catholic | 12,000 | Mangual |
| University of Puerto Rico at Cayey | Universidad de Puerto Rico en Cayey | UPRC | | Toritos & Toritas | Cayey | 1971 | Public | 4,128 | Mangual |
| University of Puerto Rico at Humacao | Universidad de Puerto Rico en Humacao | UPRH | | Buhos & Buhas | Humacao | 1975 | Public | 4,732 | Beitia |
| University of the Sacred Heart | Universidad del Sagrado Corazón | USC | | Delfines | San Juan | 1979 | Catholic | 5,261 | Beitia |
| University of Puerto Rico at Bayamón | Universidad de Puerto Rico en Bayamón | UPRB | | Vaqueros & Vaqueras | Bayamón | 1980 | Public | 5,014 | Beitia |
| University of Puerto Rico at Arecibo | Universidad de Puerto Rico en Arecibo | UPRA | | Lobos & Lobas | Arecibo | 1983 | Public | 3,693 | Mangual |
| Bayamón Central University | Universidad Central de Bayamón | UCB | | Halcones | Bayamón | 1991 | Catholic | 2,133 | Beitia |
| University of Puerto Rico at Ponce | Universidad de Puerto Rico en Ponce | UPRP | | Leones & Leonas | Ponce | 1992 | Public | 4,000 | Mangual |
| University of Puerto Rico at Aguadilla | Universidad de Puerto Rico en Aguadilla | UPRAG | | Tiburones | Aguadilla | 1992 | Public | 3,393 | Mangual |
| University of Puerto Rico at Carolina | Universidad de Puerto Rico en Carolina | UPRCA | | Jaguares | Carolina | 1994 | Public | 4,240 | Beitia |
| University of Puerto Rico at Utuado | Universidad de Puerto Rico en Utuado | UPRU | | Guaraguaos | Utuado | 1998 | Public | 1,682 | Mangual |
| Polytechnic University of Puerto Rico | Universidad Politécnica de Puerto Rico | PUPR | | Castores | San Juan | 1999 | Private | 5,195 | Beitia |
| Caribbean University | | CU | | Grifones | Bayamón | 2005 | Private | 1,603 | Beitia |
| Ana G. Méndez University | Universidad Ana G. Méndez | UAGM | | Taínos & Taínas | San Juan | 2019 (Note: UAGM was formed in 2019 from the merger of the three institutions under the Ana G. Mendez University System: the University of Turabo, Metropolitan University and the Universidad del Este, all of whom were LAI members at the time of merger.) | Private | 24,700 | Mangual |

=== Former members ===
| Institution (English) | Institution (Spanish) | Acronym | Colors | Nickname | Location (Note: All cities were located in the Commonwealth of Puerto Rico; excluding the UVI, which was located in the U.S. Virgin Islands.) | Joined | Left | Affiliation | Enrollment (Note: Undergraduate) | Section | Current conference |
|---|---|---|---|---|---|---|---|---|---|---|---|
| University of the Virgin Islands | Universidad de las Islas Vírgenes | UVI | | Bucaneros & Bucaneras | St. Thomas | 2005 | 2017 | Public | 2,138 | N/A | HBCU (HBCUAC) (Note: Currently an NAIA athletic conference.) |
| Ana G. Méndez University at Gurabo (Note: Formerly known as the University of Turabo (or Universidad del Turabo).) | Universidad Ana G. Méndez en Gurabo | UT | | Taínos & Taínas | Gurabo | 1975 | 2019 | Private | 16,000 | Mangual | N/A (Note: All three universities were former independent institutions that were part of the Ana G. Méndez University System, before being merged to form Ana G. Méndez University.) |
| Ana G. Méndez University at Carolina (Note: Formerly known as the University of the East (or Universidad del Este).) | Universidad Ana G. Méndez en Carolina | UNE | | Pitirres | Carolina | 2005 | 2019 | Private | 10,366 | Mangual | N/A |
| Ana G. Méndez University at Cupey (Note: Formerly known as the Metropolitan University of Puerto Rico (or Universidad Metropolitana).) | Universidad Ana G. Méndez en Cupey | UMET | | Cocodrilos | San Juan | 2005 | 2019 | Private | | Beitia | N/A |
| American University of Puerto Rico | | AUPR | | Piratas | Bayamón | 1991 | 2023 | Private | 2,934 | Beitia | N/A (Note: Closed following the end of the 2022–23 school year.) |

=== Membership timeline ===
Full member (non-football) Associate member (sport)
