= Lillian Negrón Colón =

Puerto Rican academic administrator

President of Bayamón Central University
- In office September 2010 – 2019
- Succeeded by: Carmen J. Cividanes Lago

Personal details
- Born: Ponce, Puerto Rico
- Children: 1
- Education: Pontifical Catholic University of Puerto Rico (B.S., M.S.); Pennsylvania State University (Ph.D.)

Lillian Negrón Colón is a Puerto Rican educator and university administrator. She became president of Bayamón Central University in 2010. Negrón Colón served 16 years as dean of the college of education at Pontifical Catholic University of Puerto Rico.

== Early life and education ==
Negrón Colón was born in Ponce, Puerto Rico to Aida Luz Colón and Francisco Negrón. She is the oldest of six siblings. Negrón Colón completed a B.S. in elementary education with a focus on special education and a M.S. in education at Pontifical Catholic University of Puerto Rico. She earned a Ph.D. in early education with a focus in curriculum and instruction from Pennsylvania State University. Her 1990 dissertation was titled The relationship between the home environment and self-perceptions of competence in young children.

== Career ==
Negrón Colón started her career as a special education teacher. As of 2018, she worked for the Pontifical Catholic University of Puerto Rico (PUCPR) for 20 years including two years as the director of the department of elementary education. She was later the dean of the college of education for 16 years. In September 2010, Negrón Colón became president of Bayamón Central University.

She assisted the Puerto Rico Department of Education and as an external evaluator of federal education programs. In 2002, she served on the Governor Sila María Calderón's advisory committee to revise the commonwealth's education policy pertaining to teacher certification. In 2009, she was nominated y Carlos E. Chardón to serve on the Universitario del Secretario de Educación advisory committee (CAUSE). Between 2012 and 2014, she served on the board of directors of the Organization of Latin American Catholic Universities (ODUCAL) and is the deputy vice president of the region including Mexico, Central America, and the Caribbean. She is the first woman to hold a position on the ODUCAL board of directors. She is the first vice president of the government's board of Association of Private Colleges and Universities of Puerto Rico (ACUP) and the president of the government's board of the Liga Atlética Interuniversitaria de Puerto Rico.

== Awards and honors ==
In 2015, Negrón Colón was recognized by the municipality of Ponce as a "mujer distinguida" transl. distinguished woman.

== Personal life ==
Negrón Colón is married to Orlando L. Rivera Quiñones, a professor. She has a daughter who is a medical psychiatrist. Negrón Colón has two grandchildren.

== See also ==
- List of women presidents or chancellors of co-ed colleges and universities
