= Mayagüez Athletics Stadium =

Stadium in Mayagüez, Puerto Rico

Coordinates: 18°11′27.91″N 67°09′20.86″W

Estadio José Antonio Figueroa Freyre
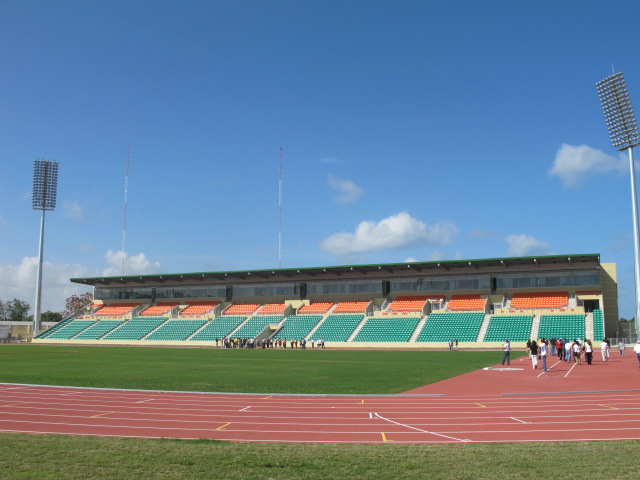
- Interactive map of Estadio José Antonio Figueroa Freyre
- Full name: Estadio José Antonio Figueroa Freyre
- Location: Mayagüez, Puerto Rico
- Capacity: 12,175
- Executive suites: 7
- Surface: FieldTurf
- Scoreboard: Sony
- Field size: 105 m × 66 m (115 yd × 72 yd)

Construction
- Groundbreaking: December 26, 2007
- Opened: January 2010
- Cost: $43,840,564

Tenants
- DS Edusoccer (2017-present); FC Mayagüez (2022-present); Puerto Rico Sol (2018–2022); Puerto Rico Cup (2020–); Central American and Caribbean Games (2010)

The Estadio Centroamericano de Mayagüez or the “Estadio José Antonio Figueroa Freyre" is a 12,175 capacity stadium in Mayagüez, Puerto Rico, opened in 2010. The stadium is owned and operated by the City of Mayaguez. It hosted the athletics and soccer games of the 2010 Central American and Caribbean Games. The stadium has a soccer field (105 meters x 66 meters) based on the requisites of International Federation of Association Football, it also has a 400-meter track which complies with the parameter of the International Association of Athletics Federations. Starting in 2023 it has also become the host of the Puerto Rican Intercollegiate Games (a.k.a. Las Justas) with all Track and Field and soccer competitions held at the stadium. Additionally, FC Mayagüez and DS Edusoccer play their home games in the Centroamericano.

The stadium is located next to the Isidoro García Baseball Stadium and across the street of the Parque del Litoral, the surrounding areas of the stadiums are part of sports complex which include a smaller running track, 2 basketball courts and 4 pickleball courts.

The first mayor event held at the stadium was the "Justas" of the Liga Atlética Interuniversitaria de Puerto Rico held between April 12 to 17, 2010, before becoming the permanent host of the event starting in 2023. From July 15 to July 17 the stadium was host to the 2011 Central American and Caribbean Championships in Athletics.

== History ==
Construction on the stadium began in 2007 in preparation for the 2010 Central American and Caribbean Games which were to be hosted in Mayagüez. The construction of the stadium was part of a redevelopment of the surrounding areas which included the rebuilding of the Isidoro Garcia Stadium and the construction of the Parque del Litoral along the coastline and across the street from the stadiums.

From April 12–17, 2010, the stadium hosted the Puerto Rican Intercollegiate Games (a.k.a. Las Justas), the event served as preparation for the Central American Games. This marked the first time Las Justas were held outside of Ponce since 1993 and it became the basis for the event eventually moving permanently to Mayagüez in 2023

On July 18, 2010, the stadium hosted the opening ceremonies of the Central American and Caribbean games (originally scheduled for July 17, 2010 and postponed due to inclement weather) with performances by Olga Tañón, Gilberto Santa Rosa and Wisin & Yandel.

In May 2019, Puerto Rico Sol FC signed a contract with the city of Mayagüez to play its home matches at the Mayagüez Athletics Stadium. As part of the deal, Sol FC would have the right to exclusive use of the stadium through 2023. The term of the agreement would not be met, however, because the Puerto Rico Sol FC ceased operations after the 2022 season.

In September 2025, it was announced that Mayagüez had secured the rights to continue hosting Las Justas until 2028 (after hosting from 2022 to 2025) meaning the stadium will continue hosting the National Collegiate Track and Field Championship until then.

The stadium shares a surrounding atrium with the Isidoro Garcia Stadium which features the "Pebetero" monument that recognizes those who worked in the 2010 Central American and Caribbean Games. In April 2026, two 3x3 Basketball and four pickleball courts were added to the atrium

== Events ==
- Central American and Caribbean Games - 2010

=== Association football ===
International women football matches
Date	Competition	Home	Away	Score	Attendance
August 30, 2018	Friendly	Puerto Rico	Argentina	0–3	4,622

== Gallery ==
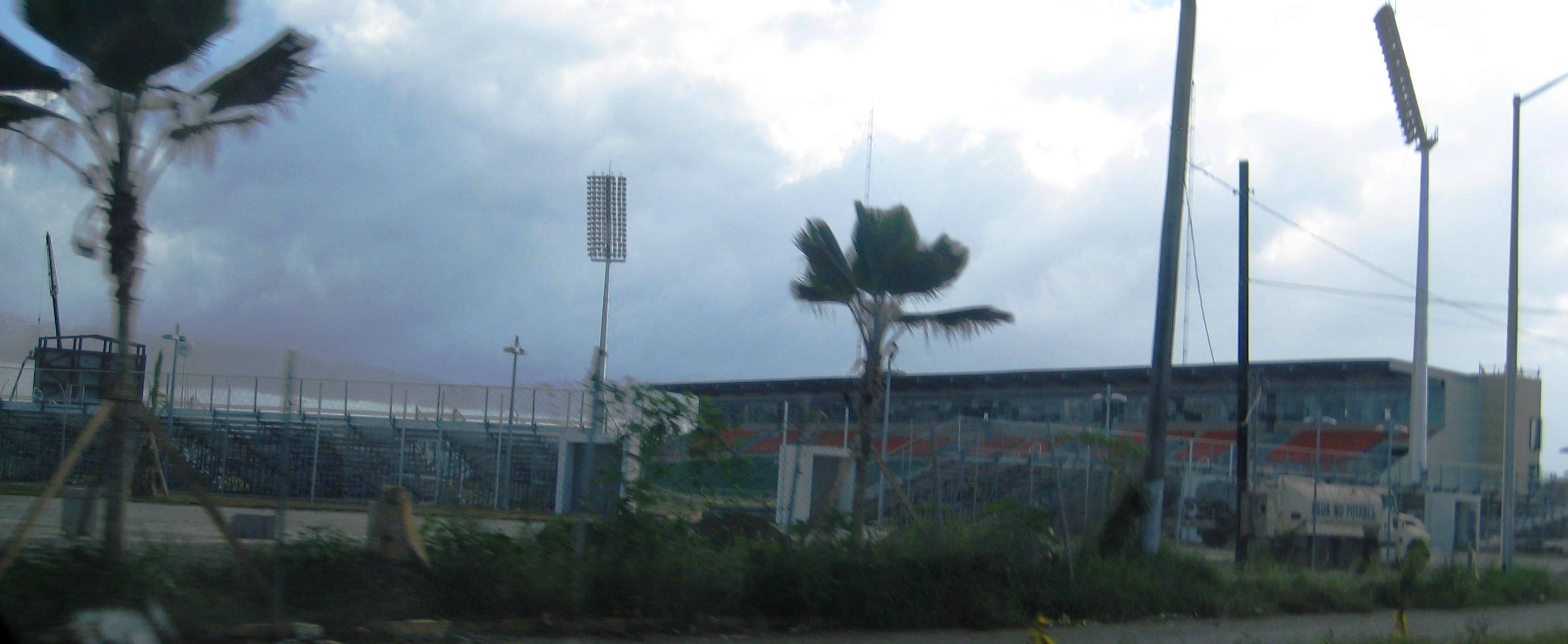
Stadium under construction

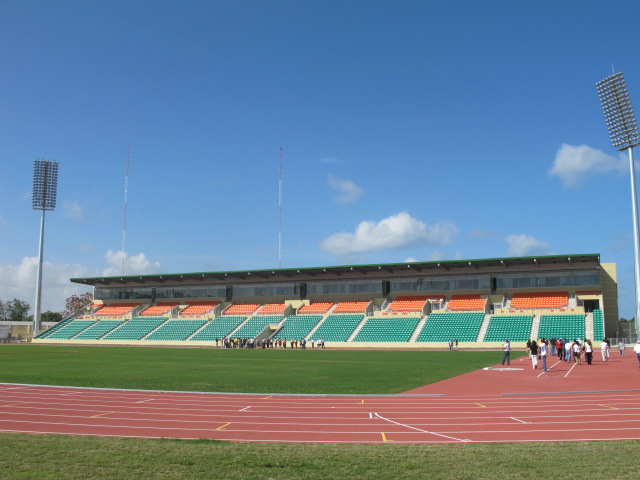
View of Stadium.

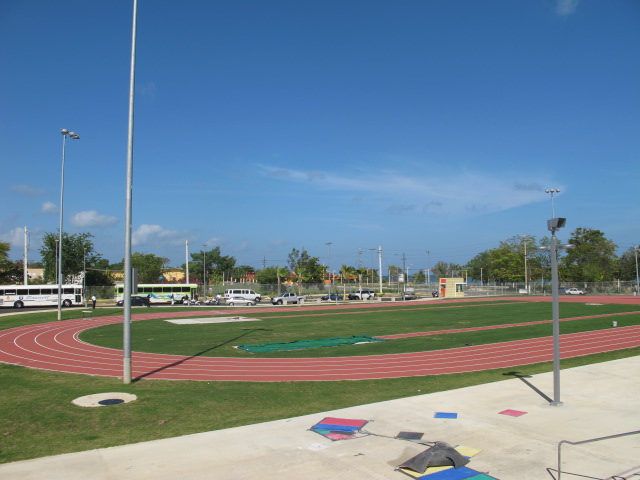
View of field

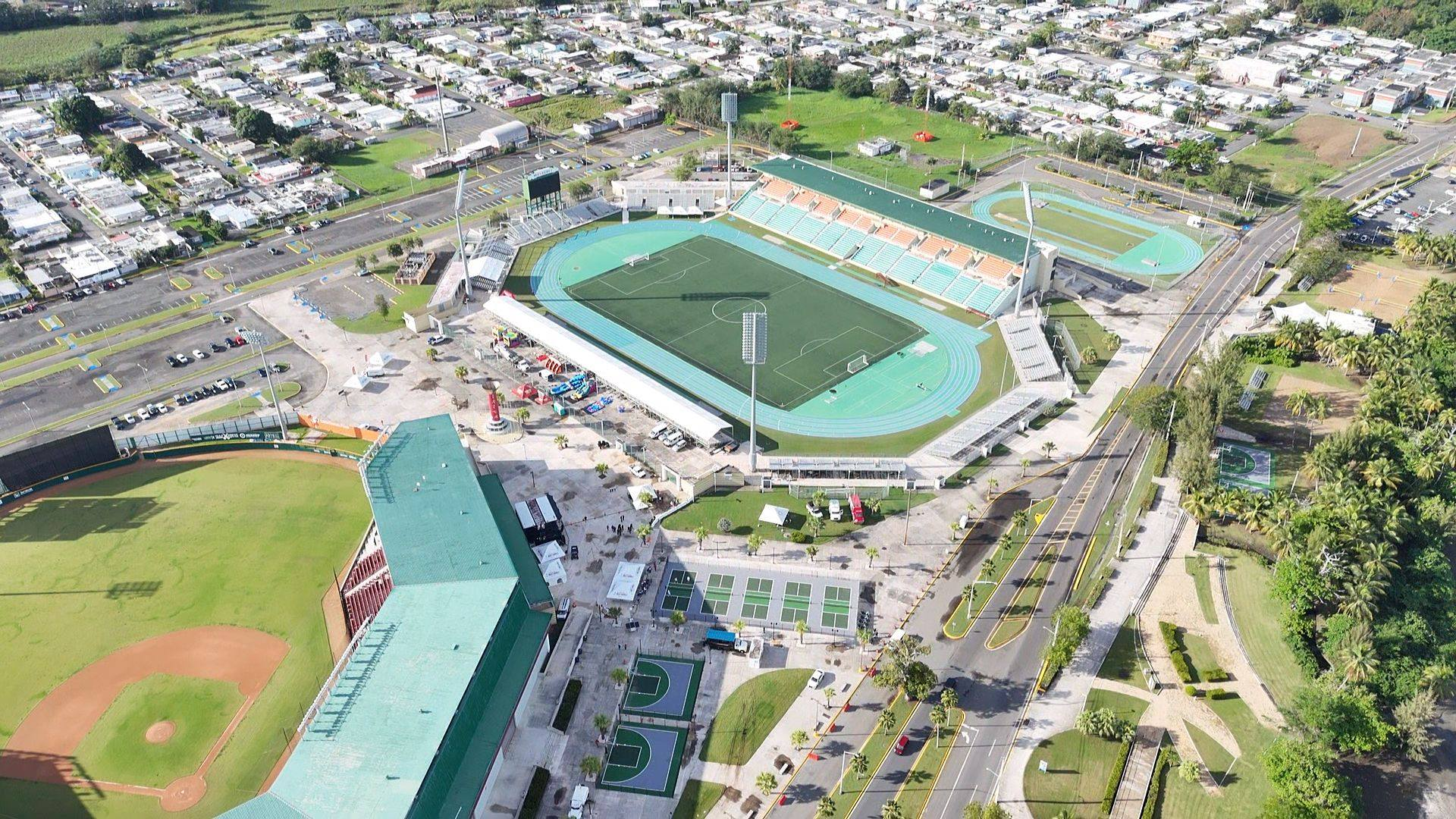
Mayagüez Athletics Stadium aerial view

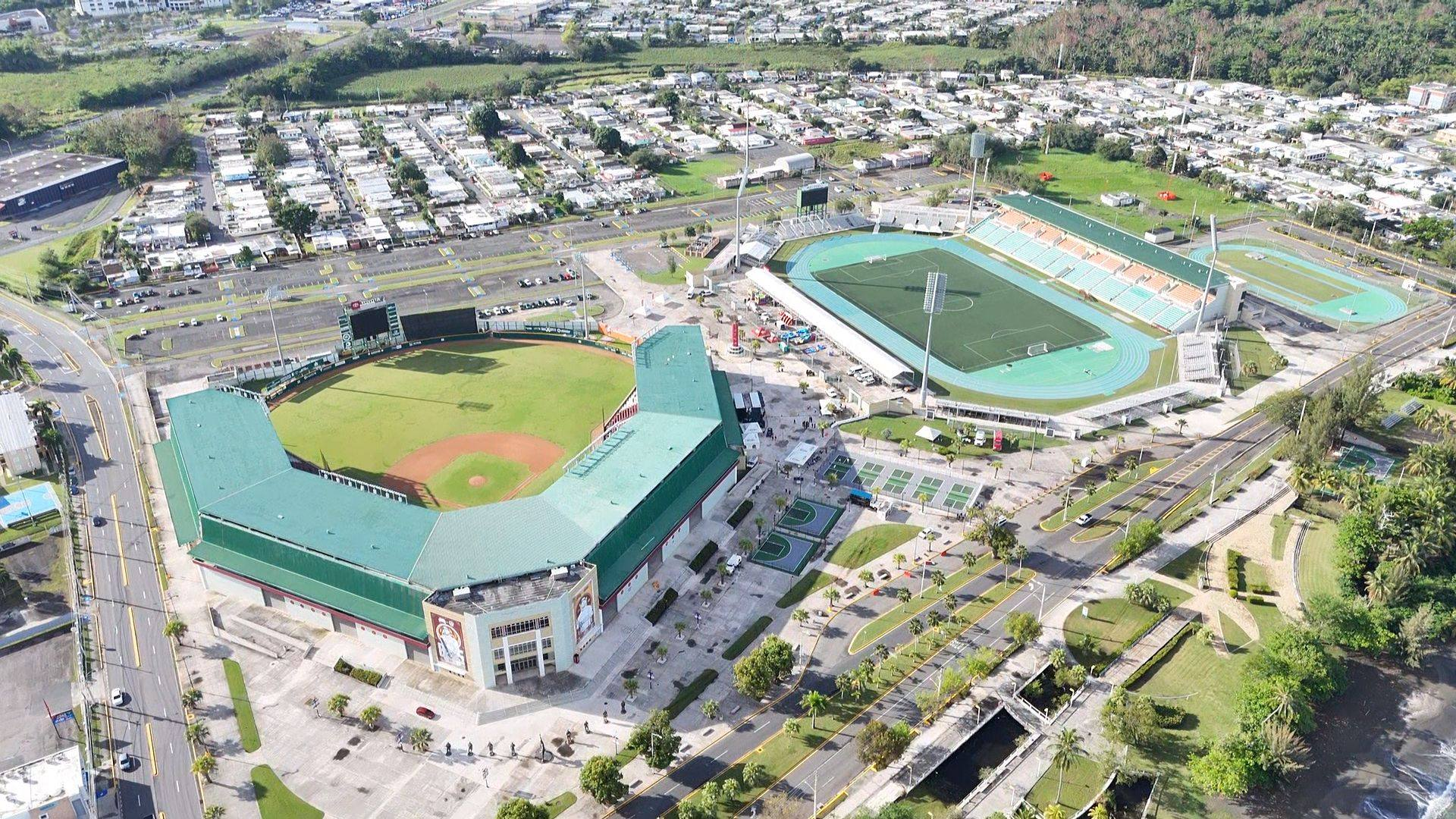
Isidoro Garcia Stadium and Mayagüez Athletics Stadium aerial view
