= Carmen J. Cividanes Lago =

Puerto Rican developmental psychologist and academic administrator

President of Bayamón Central University
- In office March 2021 – 2021
- Preceded by: Lillian Negrón Colón
- Succeeded by: Fray Oscar Morales Cruz (interim)

Personal details
- Children: 1
- Education: Mount Holyoke College; Harvard University; University of Oxford

Carmen J. Cividanes Lago is a Puerto Rican developmental psychologist and academic administrator. She was the president of the Bayamón Central University in 2021. She was previously the executive director of the Association of Private Colleges and Universities of Puerto Rico.

== Life ==
Cividanes Lago was raised in San Juan, Puerto Rico. Spanish is her native language and she was raised bilingual in English and began studying French at the age of 12. While completing a bachelor's degree at Mount Holyoke College, she studied abroad for a semester in Paris through Wesleyan University. During her undergraduate studies, Cividanes Lago taught French and Spanish. She completed a master's degree in education from Harvard University. Cividanes Lago earned a Ph.D. in developmental psychology at the University of Oxford. Her doctoral research investigated mathematical reasoning in children.

In 1994, Cividanes Lago returned to Puerto Rico after working off the island for 15 years. She worked for the graduate school of public administration at the University of Puerto Rico. Cividanes Lago served as the executive director of the Association of Private Colleges and Universities of Puerto Rico. In March 2021, she became president of Bayamón Central University. Later that year, Cividanes Lago was succeeded by interim president Fray Oscar Morales Cruz.

Cividanes Lago has a son.

Academic offices
| Preceded by Lillian Negrón Colón | President of the Bayamón Central University; 2021 – 2021 | Succeeded by Fray Oscar Morales Cruz (interim) |
