= Ana E. Cucurella-Adorno =

Ana E. Cucurella-Adorno is a Puerto Rican academic administrator serving as the president of Caribbean University. She helped the university establish the Puerto Rico's first Ph.D. program in curriculum.
