= Universidad Interamericana =

Universidad Interamericana (UNICA) is a university in Santo Domingo in the Dominican Republic that was founded on October 1, 1977 (47 years ago).
