= Helena College University of Montana =

Community college in Helena, Montana, U.S.

Coordinates: 46.595°N 112.015°W

Helena College University Of Montana
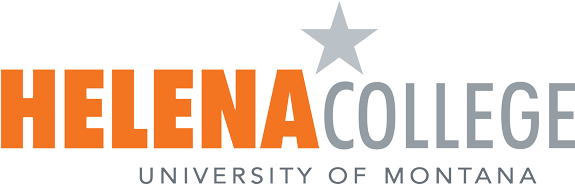
- Type: Public community college
- Established: 1939
- Parent institution: Montana University System
- Accreditation: NWCCU
- Academic affiliations: Space-grant
- Dean: Sandra Bauman
- Students: 1,496 (Fall 2023)
- Location: Helena, Montana, United States
- Website: helenacollege.edu

Helena College - University of Montana is a public community college in Helena, Montana. It was established in 1939 and was previously known as Helena College of Technology of the University of Montana, and the Helena Vocational-Technical Center. The school offers associate degrees in arts, science, and applied science as well as technical proficiency certificates in various fields.

== History ==
The institution that would become Helena College University of Montana was established in 1939 as an "Area Trade" facility designated by the Montana Office of Public Instruction. The origins of Helena College are traced to the Helena School of Aeronautics and Related Trades founded in 1931 by the Helena School District. By 1938, the school had constructed an airplane hangar to deliver specialized training in mechanics, navigation, meteorology, federal air regulations, and flight safety. Aeronautics remained the primary programming focus of the school throughout the 1940s as the United States entered World War II.

Following World War II, courses at the school were updated for returning veterans from all over Montana, as well as for local high school students. The curriculum expanded to include auto mechanics, machine shop, welding, and electronics, to accompany the aviation program. During the 1950s, diesel mechanics, building trades, and pilot training are added. Additional programs are added during the 1960s, such as practical nursing, agricultural mechanics, data processing, and other business and office courses. In 1967, the school opened a new $917,000 facility at 1115 Roberts Street to accommodate these new courses. In 1973, the original airplane hangar was renovated to meet increased demand and instructional innovations.

In 1994, the Montana Board of Regents of Higher Education restructured the Montana University System, which resulted in the Helena Vocational-Technical Center becoming affiliated with The University of Montana. The institution was renamed the Helena College of Technology of The University of Montana.

The college's facilities continued to expand throughout the 1990s and into the 21st Century. 1996 saw the creation of the student center at 1115 Roberts Street in the facility now known as the Donaldson Campus. In 2007, a $10 million expansion and renovation project was completed at the Airport and Donaldson Campuses. The expansion added more space to the Donaldson Campus, including a new library, lecture hall, science labs, student services facilities, and a multi-purpose room for continuing education and academic instruction. The Airport Campus was expanded to include a new facility for automotive technology program and expanded area for the machine tool program. In 2011, the Airport Campus was renovated again to create more opportunities for the welding technology program.

== Academics ==
The college offers Associate of Applied Science (AAS), Associate of Science (AS), and Associate of Arts (AA), and Associate of Science in Registered Nursing (ASRN) degrees as well as Certificates of Applied Science (CAS). Several of the associate degrees offer Transfer Pathways (T) or Transfer Articulation Partnerships within the Montana University System.
