= Polytechnic University of Puerto Rico =

Private university in San Juan, Puerto Rico

- Universidad Politécnica de Puerto Rico
- Type: Private university
- Established: 1966; 60 years ago
- Accreditation: MSCHE
- Academic affiliations: Space-grant
- Endowment: $23.4 million (2022)
- President: Ernesto Vázquez Martínez
- Faculty: 139 (full-time); 108 (part-time)
- Students: 4,439 (fall 2022)
- Undergraduates: 3,814 (fall 2022)
- Postgraduates: 625 (fall 2022)
- Location: San Juan, Puerto Rico; 18.423°N 66.056°W
- Campus: Large city
- Language: English and Spanish
- Colors: Royal blue and gold
- Nickname: Castores (Spanish for "beavers")
- Sporting affiliations: LAI
- Website: www.pupr.edu

The Polytechnic University of Puerto Rico (Spanish: Universidad Politécnica de Puerto Rico; shortened to PUPR in English and UPPR in Spanish, and informally referred to as Poly) is a private university based in San Juan, Puerto Rico, with additional campuses in Orlando and Miami, Florida, as well as an online virtual campus.

Founded in 1966, PUPR offers programs in various fields, including engineering, architecture, technology, and business. All courses are taught in English, with support and assessments available in both English and Spanish as needed.

== History and academics ==
PUPR was founded in September 1966, with its main campus located in Hato Rey, San Juan, Puerto Rico. PUPR is recognized as the largest private engineering school in Puerto Rico and the only one in the San Juan district, as well as one of the largest private Hispanic-serving engineering schools in the United States and its territories.

In 2001 and 2003, PUPR expanded by opening campuses in Miami and Orlando, Florida, respectively. The university offers a variety of undergraduate programs, including Bachelor of Science degrees in chemical engineering, civil engineering, computer engineering, electrical engineering, environmental engineering, industrial engineering, and mechanical engineering, as well as computer science and business administration. At the graduate level, programs include Master of Science degrees in several engineering fields, engineering management, and a Master of Business Administration.

PUPR is accredited by the Middle States Commission on Higher Education and the Puerto Rico Education Council. Its engineering programs are accredited by the Engineering Accreditation Commission of ABET, along with the Land Surveying and Mapping program. In December 2019, all ten evaluated programs received accreditation.

In June 2009, PUPR was designated a National Center of Academic Excellence (CAE) in Information Assurance Education by the National Security Agency and the U.S. Department of Homeland Security. It was re-designated in 2016 for Information Assurance and Cyber Defense until the 2020-21 academic year and received a new designation extending to 2027. Additionally, the bachelor’s degree program in architecture is accredited by the National Architectural Accrediting Board (NAAB).
