= Caribbean University =

Private university system in Puerto Rico

Caribbean University of Puerto Rico
- Motto: We believe in you and your future
- Type: Private university
- Established: 1969; 57 years ago
- President: Ana E. Cucurella-Adorno
- Location: Bayamón, Puerto Rico; 18.383170°N 66.167974°W
- Website: www.caribbean.edu

Caribbean University is a private university system in Puerto Rico composed of four campuses.

== History ==
It was founded on 28 February 1969, as the Caribbean Junior College in the municipality of Bayamon. In 1978, it was renamed to Caribbean University College of Bayamon and Dorado Puerto Rico. after being accredited by the Council on Higher Education of Puerto Rico.

In 1990, after starting to offer graduate studies, it was renamed to Caribbean University. The university offers a Masters in Education.

The university is accredited by the Accreditation Board for Engineering and Technology, Inc.

In 2016, the university expanded its STEM academic programs.

== Alliances ==
In 2015, the university formed alliances with several companies on the island and expanded its vocational training program to include degrees in Cosmetology, Nursing, Computer Programming, Business Administration and others.

In 2020, the university signed an alliance with Claro, a Puerto Rican telecommunications company in order to provide internet and other services to the community.

== Campuses ==
- Caribbean University at Bayamón (1969)
- Caribbean University at Vega Baja (1977)
- Caribbean University at Carolina (1979)
- Caribbean University at Ponce (1985)

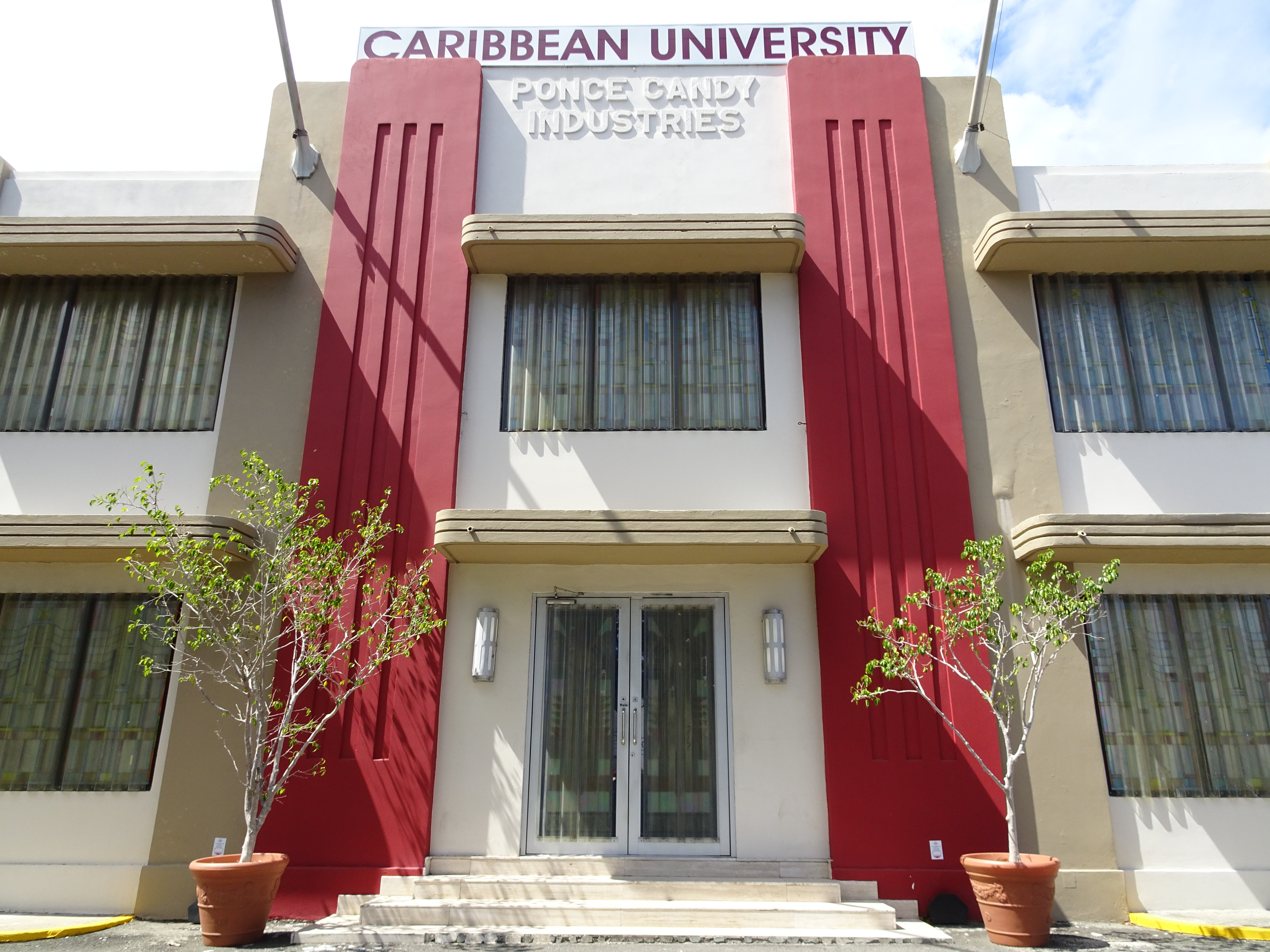
The Ponce campus of Caribbean University on Avenida La Ceiba, Barrio Sabanetas, Ponce
