= Bayamón Central University =

Catholic university in Bayamón, Puerto Rico

- Universidad Central de Bayamón
- Motto: Orden de Predicadores
- Type: Private
- Active: 1964; 62 years ago (as Universidad Católica de Bayamón); 1970; 56 years ago (renamed Universidad Central de Bayamón)–2025
- Religious affiliation: Roman Catholic
- Location: Bayamón, Puerto Rico; 18.400541°N 66.181496°W
- Campus: Suburban
- Website: www.ucb.edu.pr

The Bayamón Central University—or Universidad Central de Bayamón (UCB) in Spanish—was a private, Catholic university in Bayamón, Puerto Rico. Its predecessor began in 1961 by the Dominican Order as a community college of the Catholic University of Puerto Rico (today known as the Pontifical Catholic University of Puerto Rico). Universidad Católica de Bayamón was incorporated in 1964.

The university became autonomous on September 1, 1970, and was accredited by the Council of Higher Education of Puerto Rico, the Middle States Association of Colleges and Schools, and by the Congregation for Catholic Education.

In October 1982 a multi-use sports complex inaugurated and was dedicated in honor of Rafael Pont Flores and it bears his name.

In October 2019, U.S. federal funds were earmarked for the university.

The school was merged with the Pontifical Catholic University of Puerto Rico in 2025.
