= University of Puerto Rico at Utuado =

Public college in Utuado, Puerto Rico

- Universidad de Puerto Rico en Utuado
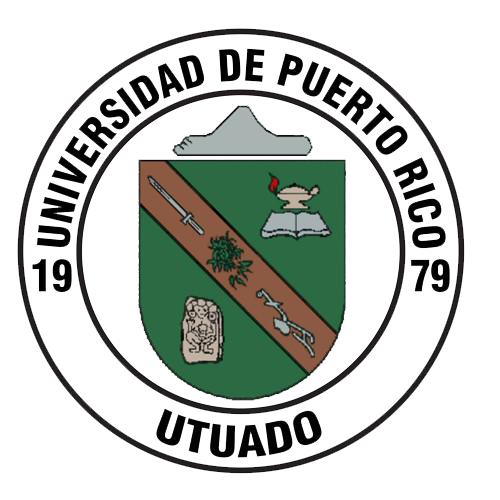
- Seal of the University of Puerto Rico at Utuado
- Other name: UPRU
- Former name: Colegio Regional de la Montaña (CORMO)
- Type: Public
- Established: 1979; 47 years ago
- President: Dra. Zayira Jordán Conde
- Rector: Dr. Ferdinand Álvarez Rivera
- Faculty: 95
- Students: 331
- Location: Utuado, Puerto Rico; 18°15′15″N 66°43′16″W
- Campus: Rural
- Colors: Forest green and Brown
- Nickname: Guaraguaos (Red-tailed Hawks)
- Sporting affiliations: LAI
- Mascot: "El Guaraguao" ("The Red-tailed Hawk")
- Website: www.uprutuado.edu

The University of Puerto Rico at Utuado (UPRU or UPR-Utuado) is a public college in Utuado, Puerto Rico. Founded in 1979, it is the youngest of the campuses that compose the University of Puerto Rico system. UPR-Utuado is also known by its previous name Colegio Regional de la Montaña (Regional College of the Mountain) and its acronym "CORMO".

The University of Puerto Rico at Utuado is the only university campus in Puerto Rico in a rural setting. The campus specializes in agricultural technological studies; it is located in the center of the island, about an hour and a half from San Juan, in a region of archaeological value where the first inhabitants of Puerto Rico, the Taino Indians, lived.

== History ==
In 2010 the campus went on strike as part of the 2010–2011 University of Puerto Rico strikes. In 2017 in response to budget cuts to the university system by the Financial Oversight and Management Board for Puerto Rico the campus students voted to join the University of Puerto Rico strikes, 2017.

Over a period of twelve years the campus student population has declined by 83% from 1,917 in 2010 to 331 in 2022.

== Academics ==
UPRU awards associate's degrees and bachelor's degrees. Many of the academic programs also offer access to four baccalaureate programs by articulated transfer to other campuses of the University of Puerto Rico.

The college has established four study projects that promote integrated technical and human issues related to agriculture and rural life in the local and international environment. These are: Research and Documentation Center of Mountain Affairs, Project for Rural Life assessment, Contemporary Articulation Learning Communities, and Sustainability First Year Infrastructure. In 2017 the campus began a bachelor's program in sustainable agriculture.

== See also ==
- 2010 University of Puerto Rico Strike
