= University of Puerto Rico at Aguadilla =

Public university campus in Aguadilla, Puerto Rico

Coordinates: 18°30′00″N 67°8′11″W

- Former name: Colegio Regional de Aguadilla (CORA)
- Motto: ¡Por Siempre Cora!
- Type: Public
- Established: 1972; 54 years ago
- President: Zayira Jordán Conde
- Rector: Wilma Santiago Gabrielini
- Faculty: 160
- Students: 1,765 (2023)
- Location: Aguadilla, Puerto Rico
- Campus: Urban
- Colors: Blue, white and gold
- Nickname: CORA
- Mascots: Sharky and Tintorera
- Website: www.uprag.edu

The University of Puerto Rico at Aguadilla (UPRAG or UPR-Aguadilla) is a public university campus in Aguadilla, Puerto Rico. It is part of the University of Puerto Rico.

In 2010 the campus went on strike as part of the 2010–2011 University of Puerto Rico strikes. In 2017 in response to budget cuts to the university system by the Financial Oversight and Management Board for Puerto Rico the campus students voted to have an intermittent strike as part of the University of Puerto Rico strikes, 2017.

== Academics ==
Located in northwestern Puerto Rico, the University of Puerto Rico at Aguadilla (UPRAg) offers Associate and Baccalaureate Degrees. Some programs are unique in the University of Puerto Rico:

- Bachelor of Science in Environmental Technology
- Bachelor of Arts in Education with a concentration in English and multimedia technology.
- Bachelor of Business Administration with concentrations in Human Resources, Computerized Information Systems, Accounting, Marketing and Finances. This program is accredited by the ACBSP.
- Bachelor of Science in Biology with emphases in Bioinformatics, Biomedical Sciences, Genetics, Quality Systems Assessment, and Biology.
- Associate degree in Aeronautics and Aerospace Technology.

The UPRAg has cooperation agreements with neighboring industry and business and design courses, programs and projects that respond to changing needs that occur in the region.

=== Departments ===
UPRAG has eight academic departments: Humanities, English, Pedagogy, Electronics, Business Administration, Office Systems, Natural Sciences, and Social Sciences.

== See also ==
- 2010 University of Puerto Rico Strike
- Pista Atletica Aguadilla
