= University of Puerto Rico at Bayamón =

Public college in Bayamón, Puerto Rico

University of Puerto Rico at Bayamon
- Universidad de Puerto Rico en Bayamón
- Motto: Cowboy Force in Action!
- Type: Public university
- Established: 1971; 55 years ago
- Parent institution: University of Puerto Rico
- Chancellor: Miguel Velez Rubio
- President: Zayira Jordan Conde
- Faculty: 189
- Undergraduates: 5,014
- Location: Bayamón, Puerto Rico
- Campus: 68 acres, Urban
- Colors: Light blue, Navy blue and White
- Nickname: Cowboys
- Mascots: Cowboy and Cowgirl
- Website: www.uprb.edu

The University of Puerto Rico at Bayamón (UPRB or UPR-Bayamón) is a public university in Bayamón, Puerto Rico. It is part of the University of Puerto Rico System (UPR) and is better known as CUTB, formerly the Colegio Universitario Tecnológico de Bayamón in Spanish. It is the third-largest campus in the UPR system by population.

The university offers undergraduate programs. It also administers an Extended University program for students who are unable to meet a regular daytime schedule, as well as partnerships with local businesses and industries that offer internships and practical training programs before graduation. UPR-Bayamón excels in the Liga Atlética Interuniversitaria's (LAI) Women's Basketball, with a historic 10 consecutive championships, and Cheerleading. It has also ranked first for five consecutive years in the dance team competition.

== See also ==
- 2010 University of Puerto Rico Strike
