= University of Puerto Rico at Arecibo =

Public college in Arecibo, Puerto Rico

- Universidad de Puerto Rico en Arecibo
- Other name: UPRA
- Former names: Colegio Regional de Arecibo (CRA); Colegio Universitario Tecnológico de Arecibo (CUTA)
- Type: Public college
- Established: 1967; 59 years ago
- President: Zayira Jordán Conde
- Rector: Dr. Lisette Marrero Valladares
- Faculty: 257
- Students: 2,875
- Location: Arecibo, Puerto Rico; 18°28′8″N 66°44′29″W
- Campus: Urban
- Colors: Yellow, White and Black
- Nickname: Wolves
- Sporting affiliations: LAI
- Mascot: The Wolves
- Website: www.upra.edu

The University of Puerto Rico at Arecibo (UPRA or UPR Arecibo) is a public college in Arecibo, Puerto Rico. It is part of the University of Puerto Rico. UPR-Arecibo was previously the Colegio Regional de Arecibo (CRA, 'Arecibo Regional College') and Colegio Universitario Tecnológico de Arecibo (CUTA, 'Arecibo Technological University College').

The college is located in the north of the island, next to the largest pharmaceutical and biotechnology complex in the Caribbean, agricultural areas of intense commercial activity and near the site of the Arecibo Observatory. It is accredited by the Middle States Association of Colleges and Schools.

== History ==
The campus was founded in 1967 and after thirteen years became known as Colegio Universitario Tecnológico de Arecibo (CUTA). The campus gained autonomy in 1998 based on the UPR board's Law 16 of June 16, 1993.

In 2010 the campus went on strike as part of the 2010–2011 University of Puerto Rico strikes. These events resulted in the firing of the university's rector and subsequently the resignation of all the deans. In 2017 in response to budget cuts to the university system by the Financial Oversight and Management Board for Puerto Rico the campus students voted to join the University of Puerto Rico strikes, 2017.

== Academics ==
UPRA offers associate and baccalaureate degrees. Unique programs on this campus of the University of Puerto Rico include:

- Bachelor of Science in Microbiology
- Bachelor of Social Science with concentration in Industrial Organizational Psychology
- Bachelor of Social Science with concentration in Latin American Studies (includes Latin American Studies Center and agreements with institutions in Latin America)
- Bachelor of Industrial Chemical Process Technology
- Associate Degree in Veterinary Technology.
- Bachelor of Business Administration including Accounting, Finance, Marketing and Management degrees.

UPRA is the alma mater of many communications professionals currently working in local and international media and independent producers who graduated from the Bachelor of Communication program ("Tele-Radial").

== Greek life ==
The University of Puerto Rico at Arecibo has two fraternities, members of the Inter-Fraternity Council of Puerto Rico.

- Phi Omega Sigma
- Phi Sigma Alpha

== Notable alumni ==
- Suheill Michelle Urdaz Montano, radio reporter at SuperK 106.
- Normando Valentín, news reporter, anchor and journalist at WAPA-TV
- Bad Bunny, singer/rapper
- Nelson Quiñones, journalist at CNN en Español
- Carlos Robles, meteorologist at Telemundo

== Gallery ==
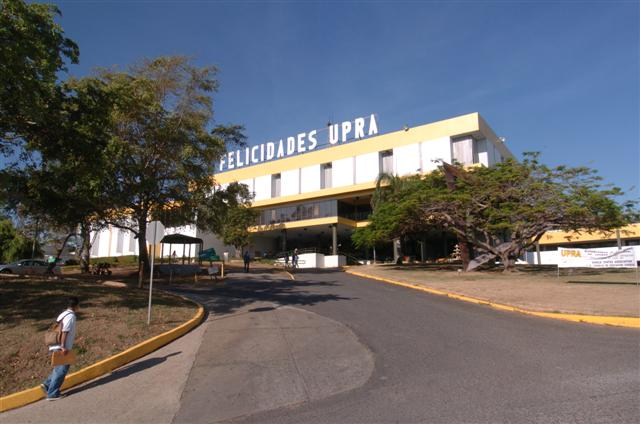
Main building

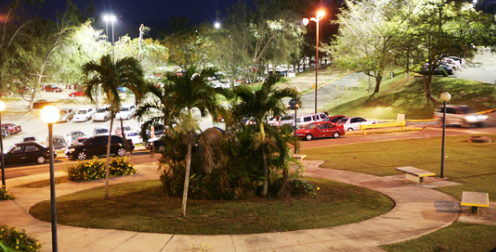
UPRA at night

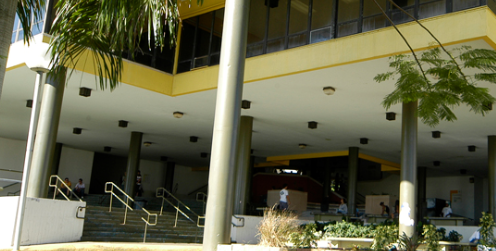
UPRA lobby

== See also ==
- Planetary Habitability Laboratory
- Abel Méndez
