= University of Puerto Rico at Carolina =

Public college in Carolina, Puerto Rico

- Verdad, valor y respeto
- Motto: Veritas, valorem, et respectu (Latin)
- Motto in English: Truth, valor, and respect (English)
- Type: Public
- Established: September 23, 1974; 52 years ago
- President: Zayira Jordán Conde
- Rector: Dr. José Meza Pereira
- Faculty: 73
- Undergraduates: 4,240
- Location: Carolina, Puerto Rico; 18°23′33″N 65°59′25″W
- Campus: Urban
- Website: www.uprc.edu

The University of Puerto Rico at Carolina (UPRC or UPR-Carolina) is a public college in Carolina, Puerto Rico. It is part of the University of Puerto Rico (UPR) and is better known as CRCA or CUNICA from its former names in Spanish of Colegio Regional de Carolina and Colegio Universitario de Carolina respectively.

UPRCA is the only college in the UPR with an academic calendar divided into quarters instead of semesters, allowing complete studies in less time. It enrolls approximately 4,000 students.

== History ==
In 2010 the campus went on strike as part of the 2010–2011 University of Puerto Rico strikes. In 2017 in response to budget cuts to the university system by the Financial Oversight and Management Board for Puerto Rico the campus students voted to join the University of Puerto Rico strikes, 2017.

== Academics ==
UPRCA awards associate degrees and bachelor's degrees. Among campuses of the University of Puerto Rico, it is unique in offering:

- Associate Degree and Bachelor of Hotel and Restaurant Administration
- Associate Degree in Interior Design
- Associate Degree in Physical Education and Recreation for people with disabilities
- Associate Degree in Mechanical Engineering Industrial Maintenance
- Associate Degree in Industrial Automation
- Associate Degree in Automotive Technology
- BA in Multidisciplinary Studies with a concentration in Cultural Tourism

UPR-Carolina also serves as the first step for students who aspire to enter the Medical Sciences Campus in the areas of Nursing, Nuclear Medicine Technology, Health Education and Veterinary Technology.

The university hosted a virtual symposium on gastronomy during the COVID-19 pandemic.

== See also ==
- 2010 University of Puerto Rico Strike
