= University of Puerto Rico at Cayey =

Public college in Cayey, Puerto Rico

- Type: Public college
- Established: 1967; 59 years ago
- Parent institution: University of Puerto Rico
- President: Zayira Jordán Conde
- Rector: Rochellie Martínez Vivas
- Academic staff: 218
- Undergraduates: 4,128
- Location: Cayey, Puerto Rico; 18°07′05″N 66°09′43″W
- Campus: 145 acres (0.59 km^{2}), Urban
- Mascot: Bull
- Website: www.cayey.upr.edu

The University of Puerto Rico at Cayey (UPR-Cayey) is a public college in Cayey, Puerto Rico. It is part of the University of Puerto Rico System. It was initially founded as a regional school in 1967 and became a college in 1969. It was awarded autonomy in April 1982.

== Academics ==
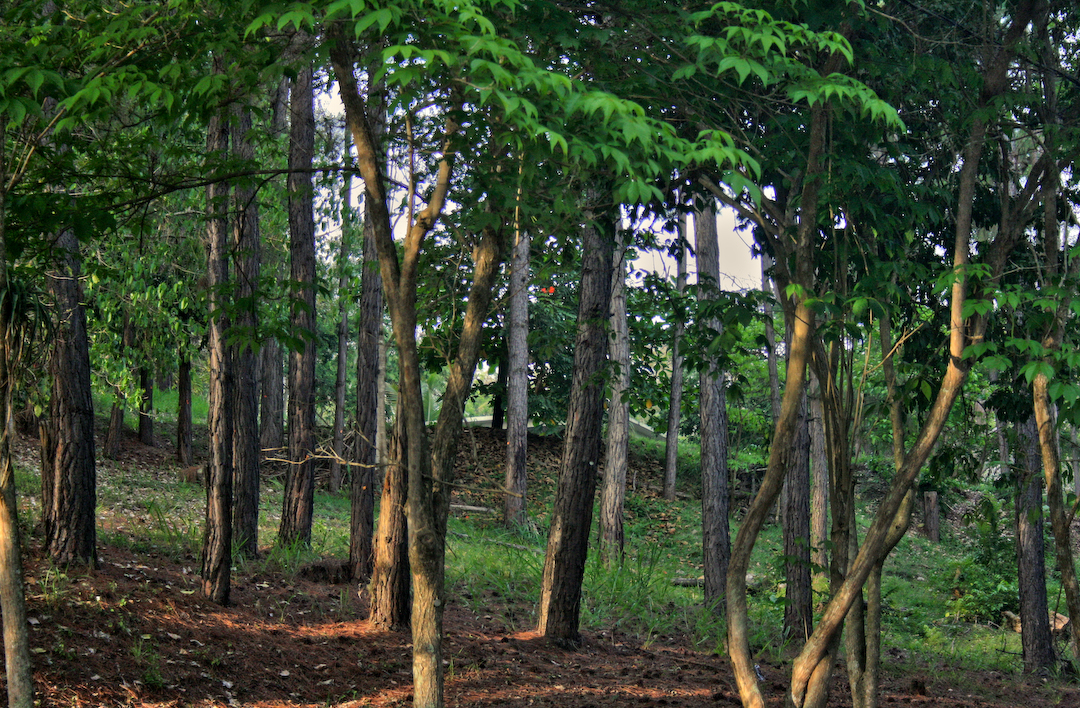
Trees at the University of Puerto Rico at Cayey

UPR Cayey awards bachelor's degrees. It serves as a starting point for students interested in applying to programs in the Medical Sciences Campus or at Mayagüez Campus.

== See also ==
- 2010 University of Puerto Rico Strike
