= List of Beta Beta Beta chapters =

== Chapters ==
The following schools have had chapters of Beta Beta Beta.

University	Chapter Name	Charter date and range	Status
Oklahoma City University	Alpha	1922	Active
Western State College	Gamma	January 15, 1925	Active
Southwestern College (Kansas)	Delta	December 28, 1925	Active
Iowa Wesleyan University (School closed in 2023)	Eta	1926-2023	Inactive
Marietta College	Iota	1926	Active
Carroll University	Mu	1927	Active
Simpson College	Beta	1927	Active
Thiel College	Kappa	1927	Active
William Jewell College	Lambda	1927	Active
Mississippi University for Women	Upsilon	1928	Active
Peru State College	Pi	1928	Active
University of Tennessee, Chattanooga	Sigma	1928	Active
Wittenberg University	Xi	1928	Active
Drury University	Chi	1929	Active
Winthrop University	Psi	1929	Active
Carthage College	Epsilon	1930	Active
Baylor University	Beta Tau	1931	Active
University of the Pacific	Omicron	1931	Active
McDaniel College	Alpha Mu	1932	Active
University of Northern Iowa	Delta Iota	1934	Active
Lake Forest College	Lambda Phi	1935	Active
Cornell College	Epsilon Iota	1937	Active
Drew University	Upsilon Delta	1937	Active
North Central College	Gamma Nu	1937	Active
Hamline University	Gamma Omicron	1939	Active
University of Richmond	Beta Theta	1939	Active
University of Montevallo	Beta Iota	1940	Active
Canisius College	Alpha Theta	1941	Active
Saint Lawrence University	Alpha Iota	1942	Active
Tulane University / Sophie Newcomb College	Beta Lambda	1942	Active
Hofstra University	Alpha Lambda	1943	Active
West Virginia Wesleyan	Beta Mu	1944	Active
Interamerican University of Puerto Rico, San Germán	Zeta Beta	1945	Active
Monmouth College	Gamma Pi	1945	Active
Randolph–Macon College	Alpha Nu	1945	Active
University of Puerto Rico at Mayagüez	Zeta Alpha	1945	Active
Huntingdon College	Beta Nu	1946	Active
Texas Woman's University	Delta Epsilon	1946	Active
Drake University	Gamma Rho	1947	Active
Notre Dame of Maryland University	Alpha Xi	1947	Active
Stetson University	Beta Xi	1947	Active
University of North Texas	Delta Zeta	1947	Active
Arkansas State University	Delta Eta	1948	Active
Hood College	Alpha Omicron	1948	Active
Mary Baldwin University	Alpha Pi	1948	Active
Murray State University	Beta Pi	1948	Active
University of Miami	Beta Omicron	1948	Active
Wake Forest University	Beta Rho	1948	Active
Westminster College	Alpha Sigma	1948	Active
Bethany College	Alpha Phi	1949	Active
Northwestern State University	Delta Theta	1949	Active
Albion College	Alpha Alpha	1950	Active
Delta State University	Beta Delta	1950	Active
Edinboro University of Pennsylvania	Alpha Chi	1950	Active
Emporia State University	Delta Kappa	1950	Active
Georgetown College	Beta Upsilon	1950	Active
Hartwick College	Alpha Omega	1950	Active
Hope College	Alpha Eta	1950	Active
University of Southern Mississippi	Beta Chi	1950	Active
California State University, Fresno	Epsilon Lambda	1951	Active
Chadron State College	Gamma Chi	1951	Active
University of North Carolina at Greensboro	Beta Gamma	1951	Active
Wartburg College	Gamma Lambda	1951	Active
Bowling Green State University	Alpha Beta	1952	Active
Cal Poly San Luis Obispo	Epsilon Pi	1952	Active
Southwestern Oklahoma State University	Delta Sigma	1952	Active
University of Pittsburgh	Alpha Gamma	1952	Active
University of Puerto Rico, Rio Piedras	Zeta Gamma	1952	Active
Lebanon Valley College	Alpha Zeta	1953	Active
University of North Alabama	Beta Zeta	1953	Active
Appalachian State University	Beta Psi	1954	Active
Berea College	Beta Epsilon	1954	Active
Saint Elizabeth University	Alpha Epsilon	1954	Active
Mercer University	Beta Omega	1954	Active
Midwestern State University	Delta Mu	1954	Active
Oklahoma Baptist University	Delta Beta	1954	Active
Florida Southern College	Beta Eta	1955	Active
Heidelberg University (Ohio)	Eta Beta	1955	Active
University of Delaware	Alpha Psi	1955	Active
Western Illinois University	Gamma Iota	1955	Active
Augustana College (Illinois)	Gamma Sigma	1956	Active
Central Methodist University	Gamma Upsilon	1956	Active
St. Catherine University	Gamma Alpha	1956	Active
Loyola University New Orleans	Eta Lambda	1956	Active
University of Central Missouri	Gamma Phi	1956	Active
Adelphi University	Eta Epsilon	1957	Active
Alma College	Gamma Beta	1957	Active
Fairmont State University	Eta Theta	1957	Active
Greenville University	Gamma Gamma	1957	Active
Grove City College	Eta Zeta	1957	Active
Roanoke College	Eta Eta	1957	Active
Emory & Henry College	Eta Iota	1958	Active
Samford University	Eta Nu	1958	Active
Southern University Baton Rouge	Eta Mu	1958	Active
Augustana University	Gamma Zeta	1959	Active
Austin Peay State University	Eta Pi	1959	Active
Emmanuel College (Massachusetts)	Eta Rho	1959	Active
Northern Arizona University	Epsilon Eta	1959	Active
Saint Mary's University of Minnesota	Gamma Epsilon	1959	Active
Carson–Newman University	Eta Tau	1960	Active
Elmira College	Eta Sigma	1960	Active
Pittsburg State University	Gamma Psi	1960	Active
Pontifical Catholic University of Puerto Rico	Zeta Delta	1960	Active
University of Wisconsin–Whitewater	Gamma Mu	1960	Active
Eastern Illinois University	Gamma Theta	1961	Active
Mount Mary University, Wisconsin	Theta Alpha	1961	Active
Stephen F. Austin State University	Delta Lambda	1961	Active
Texas A&M University–Commerce	Delta Gamma	1961	Active
University of Wisconsin–Platteville	Theta Beta	1961	Active
Central Michigan University	Theta Zeta	1962	Active
Ouachita Baptist University	Delta Nu	1962	Active
University of Dayton	Theta Kappa	1962	Active
California State Polytechnic University, Pomona	Epsilon Nu	1963	Active
Elizabeth City State University	Eta Chi	1963	Active
Iona University	Theta Xi	1963	Active
Lamar University	Delta Omicron	1963	Active
Maryville College	Eta Phi	1963	Active
North Park University	Theta Mu	1963	Active
Saint Ambrose University	Theta Theta	1963	Active
West Texas A&M University	Delta Xi	1963	Active
Austin College	Delta Rho	1964	Active
Daemen University	Theta Upsilon	1964	Active
Illinois Wesleyan University	Theta Rho	1964	Active
Nebraska Wesleyan University	Theta Tau	1964	Active
Cedar Crest College	Theta Psi	1965	Active
Elmhurst University	Iota Alpha	1965	Active
Loyola University Maryland	Theta Chi	1965	Active
Sam Houston State University	Delta Tau	1965	Active
Shorter University	Kappa Alpha	1965	Active
Texas Southern University	Delta Upsilon	1965	Active
Aquinas College (Michigan)	Lambda Alpha	1966	Active
Gannon University	Theta Omega	1966	Active
Georgia College & State University	Kappa Gamma	1966	Active
Keene State College	Lambda Zeta	1966	Active
Northwest Missouri State University	Iota Beta	1966	Active
Ohio Northern University	Lambda Gamma	1966	Active
Rider University	Lambda Beta	1966	Active
Rutgers University–Newark	Lambda Delta	1966	Active
University of Alabama	Kappa Beta	1966	Active
Adrian College	Lambda Pi	1967	Active
Frostburg State University	Lambda Nu	1967	Active
Hardin–Simmons University	Delta Psi	1967	Active
Middle Tennessee State University	Kappa Delta	1967	Active
Ripon College (Wisconsin)	Iota Delta	1967	Active
State University of New York at Potsdam	Lambda Xi	1967	Active
Texas State University	Kappa Zeta	1967	Active
Georgia Institute of Technology	Sigma Beta	1968	Active
Jackson State University	Sigma Epsilon	1968	Active
Jacksonville University	Sigma Alpha	1968	Active
Pace University–New York City	Upsilon Iota	1968	Active
Prairie View A&M University	Sigma Chi	1968	Active
State University of New York at Fredonia	Upsilon Chi	1968	Active
Tarleton State University	Sigma Delta	1968	Active
Towson University	Upsilon Eta	1968	Active
University of Maine at Farmington	Upsilon Kappa	1968	Active
Barry University	Sigma Eta	1969	Active
Erskine College	Sigma Gamma	1969	Active
Fairleigh Dickinson University	Upsilon Lambda	1969	Active
Mount Saint Mary's University (MD)	Upsilon Mu	1969	Active
Muskingum University	Upsilon Nu	1969	Active
Old Dominion University	Kappa Epsilon	1969	Active
Regis College (Massachusetts)	Upsilon Omega	1969	Active
Saint Louis University	Iota Chi	1969	Active
University of New Orleans	Kappa Chi	1969	Active
University of San Francisco	Omicron Alpha	1969	Active
University of Wisconsin–Eau Claire	Iota Gamma	1969	Active
Angelo State University	Epsilon Sigma	1970	Active
Central State University (OH)	Lambda Iota	1970	Active
Holy Family University	Lambda Chi	1970	Active
Juniata College	Lambda Epsilon	1970	Active
Kansas Wesleyan University	Iota Eta	1970	Active
Loyola University Chicago	Lambda Omega	1970	Active
New Mexico Institute of Mining and Technology	Epsilon Chi	1970	Active
Slippery Rock University	Lambda Lambda	1970	Active
Virginia State University	Mu Eta	1970	Active
Westminster College (Missouri)	Iota Kappa	1970	Active
Colgate University	Upsilon Phi	1971	Active
Mercyhurst University	Upsilon Pi	1971	Active
Mississippi College	Mu Beta	1971	Active
Quinnipiac University	Upsilon Omicron	1971	Active
Doane University	Iota Mu	1972	Active
Manhattanville University	Upsilon Sigma	1972	Active
Salisbury University	Lambda Psi	1972	Active
Sul Ross State University	Epsilon Omega	1972	Active
Western Kentucky University	Mu Gamma	1972	Active
Augusta State University	Kappa Kappa	1973	Active
Dillard University	Kappa Iota	1973	Active
Texas A&M University–Corpus Christi	Epsilon Phi	1973	Active
Texas Lutheran University	Epsilon Psi	1973	Active
University of Mississippi	Beta Kappa	1973	Active
University of Wisconsin Stevens Point	Lambda Omicron	1973	Active
Cabrini College	Lambda Rho	1974	Active
LIU Post	Upsilon Psi	1974	Active
Longwood University	Kappa Lambda	1974	Active
Troy State University	Mu Epsilon	1974	Active
University of Nebraska Omaha	Iota Omega	1974	Active
University of Puerto Rico at Cayey	Zeta Epsilon	1974	Active
West Virginia University	Kappa Mu	1974	Active
Alcorn State University	Kappa Omega	1975	Active
Benedictine University	Iota Pi	1975	Active
Birmingham Southern College	Kappa Psi	1975	Active
University of Mount Saint Vincent	Chi Epsilon	1975	Active
Millsaps College	Kappa Pi	1975	Active
Mount Saint Mary College (NY)	Lambda Theta	1975	Active
Russell Sage College	Chi Alpha	1975	Active
Southern Adventist University	Kappa Phi	1975	Active
Susquehanna University	Lambda Sigma	1975	Active
Averett University	Kappa Theta	1976	Active
Henderson State University	Kappa Rho	1976	Active
Hillsdale College	Iota Psi	1976	Active
Judson College (School suspended operations 2021)	Kappa Sigma	1976-2021	Inactive
Monmouth University (NJ)	Chi Eta	1976	Active
Oral Roberts University	Mu Kappa	1976	Active
Southern University at New Orleans	Kappa Omicron	1976	Active
Tennessee Technological University	Kappa Tau	1976	Active
Whittier College	Omicron Chi	1976	Active
Gustavus Adolphus College	Iota Rho	1977	Active
Southeast Missouri State University	Iota Sigma	1977	Active
Stephens College	Iota Tau	1977	Active
University of Texas at Tyler	Kappa Xi	1977	Active
Worcester State University	Chi Iota	1977	Active
Xavier University of Louisiana	Sigma Kappa	1977	Active
California University of Pennsylvania	Upsilon Theta	1978	Active
Colorado State University Pueblo	Phi Alpha	1978	Active
Elon University	Sigma Mu	1978	Active
Northeastern State University	Psi Alpha	1978	Active
Suffolk University	Chi Kappa	1978	Active
University of Tampa	Sigma Nu	1978	Active
University of Texas at Austin	Kappa Upsilon	1978	Active
Wesleyan College	Sigma Lambda	1978	Active
Charleston Southern University	Sigma Pi	1979	Active
Clarion University of Pennsylvania	Upsilon Xi	1979	Active
Guilford College	Sigma Phi	1979	Active
James Madison University	Psi Beta	1979	Active
McMurry University	Pi Beta	1979	Active
Missouri State University	Iota Theta	1979	Active
Savannah State University	Sigma Omicron	1979	Active
University of Michigan Dearborn	Xi Alpha	1979	Active
University of Tulsa	Pi Alpha	1979	Active
East Central University	Psi Delta	1980	Active
Lycoming College	Rho Beta	1980	Active
Saint Francis University	Upsilon Beta	1980	Active
Saint Mary's College (Indiana)	Xi Chi	1980	Active
Trine University	Xi Beta	1980	Active
Ursinus College	Rho Alpha	1980	Active
Christian Brothers University	Mu Tau	1981	Active
Florida Institute of Technology	Sigma Psi	1981	Active
Kean University	Chi Mu	1981	Active
Pace University Pleasantville	Upsilon Alpha	1981	Active
Texas Wesleyan University	Sigma Theta	1981	Active
University of Nebraska–Lincoln	Iota Upsilon	1981	Active
Berry College	Tau Alpha	1982	Active
East Tennessee State University	Pi Delta	1982	Active
Eastern Michigan University	Xi Delta	1982	Active
Georgia State University	Eta Psi	1982	Active
Indiana University – Purdue University Fort Wayne	Xi Epsilon	1982	Active
Meredith College	Tau Xi	1982	Active
Methodist University	Tau Zeta	1982	Active
State University of New York Cortland	Upsilon Epsilon	1982	Active
Belmont Abbey College	Tau Upsilon	1983	Active
Greensboro College	Tau Theta	1983	Active
Jacksonville State University (AL)	Mu Phi	1983	Active
Mercy University	Upsilon Zeta	1983	Active
Presbyterian College	Tau Psi	1983	Active
Queens University of Charlotte	Tau Tau	1983	Active
University of Pittsburgh Johnstown	Phi Delta	1983	Active
Wheaton College (Massachusetts)	Chi Nu	1983	Active
Allegheny College	Phi Epsilon	1984	Active
Bloomsburg University	Rho Chi	1984	Active
Cameron University	Psi Eta	1984	Active
Framingham State University	Chi Omega	1984	Active
Illinois College	Iota Xi	1984	Active
Mississippi State University	Mu Sigma	1984	Active
Southern Illinois University	Iota Zeta	1984	Active
Trinity University (Texas)	Epsilon Rho	1984	Active
Armstrong Atlantic State University	Tau Chi	1985	Active
Mount St. Joseph University	Xi Gamma	1985	Active
Gardner–Webb University	Tau Sigma	1985	Active
LeMoyne College	Chi Pi	1985	Active
Point Loma Nazarene University	Omicron Delta	1985	Active
St. Norbert College	Omega Alpha	1985	Active
Springfield College	Chi Phi	1985	Active
Talladega College	Mu Pi	1985	Active
CUNY Lehman College	Chi Psi	1986	Active
Eastern Oregon University	Omicron Theta	1986	Active
Indiana University Northwest	Xi Iota	1986	Active
Moravian University	Rho Eta	1986	Active
Norwich University	Chi Sigma	1986	Active
Shippensburg University	Rho Epsilon	1986	Active
The Citadel	Tau Nu	1986	Active
William Paterson University	Chi Rho	1986	Active
Augsburg University	Omega Lambda	1987	Active
Fort Lewis College	Epsilon Upsilon	1987	Active
Interamerican University of Puerto Rico, Metropolitan Campus	Zeta Zeta	1987	Active
Missouri Western State University	Psi Xi	1987	Active
Northeastern Illinois University	Omega Xi	1987	Active
Pacific University	Omicron Xi	1987	Active
St. Andrews University (North Carolina)	Tau Rho	1987	Active
Holy Family College (School closed in 2020)	Omega Beta	1987-2020	Active
Sonoma State University	Omicron Lambda	1987	Active
Southern Arkansas University	Psi Gamma	1987	Active
Truman State University	Psi Zeta	1987	Active
University of Portland	Epsilon Zeta	1987	Active
University of South Carolina Columbia	Tau Mu	1987	Active
Wagner College	Eta Upsilon	1987	Active
Auburn University	Mu Psi	1988	Active
Belmont University	Mu Theta	1988	Active
Colorado Mesa University	Epsilon Omicron	1988	Active
Concordia College (Moorhead, Minnesota)	Omega Nu	1988	Active
Kennesaw State University	Tau Epsilon	1988	Active
Louisiana State University Baton Rouge	Eta Alpha	1988	Active
Minnesota State University Moorhead	Omega Mu	1988	Active
Northern Michigan University	Omega Chi	1988	Active
Saint Olaf College	Omega Kappa	1988	Active
University of Georgia	Tau Delta	1988	Active
Andrews University	Xi Lambda	1989	Active
Rockhurst University	Pi Epsilon	1989	Active
University of Missouri	Pi Eta	1989	Active
University of North Carolina Charlotte	Tau Lambda	1989	Active
University of Tennessee Martin	Mu Upsilon	1989	Active
Wofford College	Tau Pi	1989	Active
Ashland University	Xi Mu	1990	Active
Saint Xavier University	Omega Delta	1990	Active
Salem College	Beta Alpha	1990	Active
South Dakota State University	Pi Chi	1990	Active
University of the Cumberlands	Beta Sigma	1990	Active
University of Saint Thomas (Minnesota)	Gamma Tau	1990	Active
University of Science and Arts of Oklahoma	Psi Iota	1990	Active
University of Southern Maine	Chi Tau	1990	Active
Adams State University	Phi Eta	1991	Active
Saint Mary's University (Texas)	Delta Pi	1991	Active
University of Pittsburgh Bradford	Alpha Kappa	1991	Active
USAF Academy	Phi Gamma	1991	Active
Bethel University (Minnesota)	Gamma Omega	1992	Active
Catawba College	Tau Eta	1992	Active
College of New Jersey	Chi Upsilon	1992	Active
Ithaca College	Chi Xi	1992	Active
Rhodes College	Mu Rho	1992	Active
St. Mary's College of Maryland	Rho Gamma	1992	Active
Siena Heights University	Xi Omega	1992	Active
Southern Oregon University	Omicron Epsilon	1992	Active
University of Washington	Omicron Eta	1992	Active
East Carolina University	Tau Gamma	1993	Active
Grand Valley State University	Xi Omicron	1993	Active
Northern Kentucky University	Mu Iota	1993	Active
Central Washington University	Omicron Gamma	1994	Active
Columbus State University	Mu Omicron	1994	Active
Metropolitan University (Puerto Rico)	Zeta Eta	1994	Active
Ohio University	Xi Phi	1994	Active
Saint Martin's University	Omicron Iota	1994	Active
Santa Clara University	Epsilon Kappa	1994	Active
University of North Carolina Chapel Hill	Tau Iota	1994	Active
University of Scranton	Alpha Tau	1994	Active
Widener University	Rho Kappa	1994	Active
Winona State University	Gamma Delta	1994	Active
Bradley University	Omega Epsilon	1995	Active
Carlow University	Lambda Tau	1995	Active
Davidson College	Tau Omega	1995	Active
Francis Marion University	Tau Omicron	1995	Active
Howard Payne University	Delta Chi	1995	Active
State University of New York Geneseo	Lambda Kappa	1995	Active
Washington College	Rho Iota	1995	Active
Central Connecticut State University	Chi Beta	1996	Active
Chatham University	Lambda Eta	1996	Active
Duquesne University	Xi Psi	1996	Active
Elizabethtown College	Rho Lambda	1996	Active
Georgian Court University	Chi Gamma	1996	Active
Grand View University	Gamma Eta	1996	Active
Hanover College	Mu Xi	1996	Active
North Carolina A&T University	Tau Phi	1996	Active
Purdue University	Xi Pi	1996	Active
Saint Anselm College	Chi Zeta	1996	Active
University of Missouri–St. Louis	Iota Lambda	1996	Active
Agnes Scott College	Sigma Upsilon	1997	Active
Cal State University Los Angeles	Epsilon Theta	1997	Active
Eastern Connecticut State University	Eta Omega	1997	Active
Georgia Southern University	Tau Kappa	1997	Active
Texas A&M University Galveston	Delta Delta	1997	Active
Transylvania University	Mu Delta	1997	Active
Trinidad State Junior College	Phi Alpha Club	1997	Active
University of Tennessee Knoxville	Mu Zeta	1997	Active
Wheeling Jesuit University	Alpha Delta	1997	Active
Caldwell College	Rho Mu	1998	Active
College of Wooster	Xi Nu	1998	Active
Midway University	Mu Chi	1998	Active
Palo Alto College	Delta Pi Club	1998	Active
Purdue University North Central	Xi Rho	1998	Active
St. Peter's University	Rho Nu	1998	Active
University of Wisconsin Green Bay	Omega Eta	1998	Active
Baldwin Wallace University	Xi Theta	1999	Active
Centre College	Kappa Nu	1999	Active
Culver–Stockton College	Pi Kappa	1999	Active
Hawaii Pacific University	Phi Kappa	1999	Active
Hendrix College	Mu Omega	1999	Active
Iowa State University	Iota Nu	1999	Active
Lewis University	Omega Omicron	1999	Active
Loyola Marymount University	Epsilon Delta	1999	Active
McPherson College	Iota Iota	1999	Active
Penn State Erie, The Behrend College	Rho Omicron	1999	Active
Radford University	Sigma Rho	1999	Active
Ramapo College	Upsilon Upsilon	1999	Active
Southeastern Louisiana University	Kappa Eta	1999	Active
Southwestern University	Delta Alpha	1999	Active
Texas Tech University	Nu Alpha	1999	Active
University of Saint Thomas (Texas)	Nu Beta	1999	Active
University of West Alabama	Beta Phi	1999	Active
Capital University	Xi Tau	2000	Active
Johns Hopkins University	Rho Phi	2000	Active
Shawnee State University	Xi Upsilon	2000	Active
University of Kansas	Pi Lambda	2000	Active
University of Maine Orono	Chi Delta	2000	Active
University of North Carolina Wilmington	Sigma Sigma	2000	Active
University of Nevada Las Vegas	Phi Lambda	2000	Active
Avila University	Pi Iota	2001	Active
Morningside University	Tau	2001	Active
University of Mount Union	Xi Zeta	2001	Active
Peace College	Sigma Iota	2001	Active
University of Minnesota Morris	Gamma Xi	2001	Active
Westminster University (Utah)	Phi Mu	2001	Active
Wilkes University	Theta Delta	2001	Active
Williams Baptist University	Mu Mu	2001	Active
Arkansas Tech University	Psi Kappa	2002	Active
Bethany College (Kansas)	Pi Mu	2002	Active
Brevard College	Rho Pi	2002	Active
Central College (Iowa)	Pi Nu	2002	Active
Chicago State University	Omega Phi	2002	Active
Clarkson University	Eta Omicron	2002	Active
Florida State University	Sigma Tau	2002	Active
Hastings College	Pi Omicron	2002	Active
Houston Community College	Sigma Chi Club	2002	Active
Lincoln University (Missouri)	Pi Omega	2002	Active
Lincoln University (Pennsylvania)	Rho Psi	2002	Active
University of Mount Olive	Sigma Zeta	2002	Active
Niagara University	Eta Xi	2002	Active
University of Holy Cross	Eta Gamma	2002	Active
Rivier University	Eta Delta	2002	Active
Shepherd University	Rho Omega	2002	Active
University of Alaska Fairbanks	Phi Nu	2002	Active
University of Central Oklahoma	Psi Mu	2002	Active
University of North Carolina Pembroke	Psi Lambda	2002	Active
Washburn University	Pi Gamma	2002	Active
York College of Pennsylvania	Theta Epsilon	2002	Active
Cumberland University	Pi Sigma	2003	Active
Furman University	Psi Nu	2003	Active
Lee University	Psi Omega	2003	Active
University of Lynchburg	Rho Tau	2003	Active
Marymount University	Eta Kappa	2003	Active
Nova Southeastern University	Rho Rho	2003	Active
Ohio State University	Xi Eta	2003	Active
Rensselaer Polytechnic Institute	Theta Eta	2003	Active
Roger Williams University	Theta Gamma	2003	Active
St. Joseph's University (New York)	Theta Iota	2003	Active
Saint Leo University	Sigma Omega	2003	Active
State University of West Georgia	Rho Sigma	2003	Active
Thomas More University	Rho Theta	2003	Active
University of Wisconsin Madison	Omega Pi	2003	Active
Bridgewater State University	Theta Lambda	2004	Active
Dominican University of California	Phi Pi	2004	Active
La Sierra University	Phi Omega	2004	Active
Reinhardt University	Psi Pi	2004	Active
State University of New York Oneonta	Theta Nu	2004	Active
University of Alaska Anchorage	Phi Sigma	2004	Active
University of Kentucky	Mu Lambda	2004	Active
University of Massachusetts Boston	Theta Omicron	2004	Active
University of Northern Colorado	Phi Omicron	2004	Active
University of Texas at San Antonio	Nu Chi	2004	Active
Valdosta State University	Psi Phi	2004	Active
Villanova University	Rho Upsilon	2004	Active
Virginia Military Institute	Psi Omicron	2004	Active
Virginia Wesleyan University	Psi Chi	2004	Active
Willamette University	Phi Psi	2004	Active
Indiana State University	Xi Kappa	2005	Active
Syracuse University	Rho Xi	2005	Active
University of Pittsburgh Greensburg	Theta Pi	2005	Active
University of Puerto Rico at Ponce	Zeta Kappa	2005	Active
University of the Ozarks	Nu Eta	2005	Active
University of Vermont	Upsilon Tau	2005	Active
Viterbo University	Omega Psi	2005	Active
Christopher Newport University	Psi Sigma	2006	Active
Clemson University	Pi Theta	2006	Active
Coastal Carolina University	Psi Upsilon	2006	Active
Covenant College	Psi Tau	2006	Active
Lander University	Psi Theta	2006	Active
North Georgia College & State University	Psi Rho	2006	Active
University of Saint Joseph (Connecticut)	Rho Zeta	2006	Active
State University of New York Brockport	Omega Upsilon	2006	Active
University of Louisiana Monroe	Nu Gamma	2006	Active
University of South Florida	Psi Psi	2006	Active
University of Texas at Arlington	Nu Epsilon	2006	Active
University of Toledo	Alpha Rho	2006	Active
Blue Mountain Christian University	Pi Tau	2007	Active
Chowan University	Pi Upsilon	2007	Active
Drexel University	Omega Sigma	2007	Active
Jarvis Christian University	Delta Phi	2007	Active
Louisiana State University in Shreveport	Nu Iota	2007	Active
Minnesota State University, Mankato	Pi Psi	2007	Active
New Jersey Institute of Technology	Omega Tau	2007	Active
Texas A&M International University	Nu Kappa	2007	Active
University of Colorado Denver	Phi Rho	2007	Active
William Woods University	Pi Phi	2007	Active
Colorado School of Mines	Omicron Nu	2008	Active
Copiah–Lincoln Community College	Mu Beta Beta Club	2008	Active
Florida International University	Pi Xi	2008	Active
Hinds Community College	Mu Beta Club	2008	Active
Luther College	Pi Rho	2008	Active
Manhattan College	Chi Theta	2008	Active
New Jersey City University	Nu Pi	2008	Active
Oklahoma State University	Nu Lambda	2008	Active
Sacred Heart University	Nu Phi	2008	Active
Simmons University	Nu Omicron	2008	Active
Texas A&M University–Kingsville	Nu Delta	2008	Active
University of Texas Rio Grande Valley	Nu Omega	2008	Active
Bridgewater College	Nu Upsilon	2009	Active
California Lutheran University	Phi Tau	2009	Active
Clayton State University	Phi Upsilon	2009	Active
Converse University	Nu Xi	2009	Active
Dominican University of New York	Nu Psi	2009	Active
Misericordia University	Nu Rho	2009	Active
Morehead State University	Phi Theta	2009	Active
University of Northwestern – St. Paul	Omicron Sigma	2009	Active
Park University	Omicron Psi	2009	Active
University of Pikeville	Pi Zeta	2009	Active
Randolph College	Nu Theta	2009	Active
Richard Stockton College	Nu Tau	2009	Active
Southern Nazarene University	Omicron Phi	2009	Active
Spring Hill College	Psi Epsilon	2009	Active
Stevenson University	Nu Sigma	2009	Active
Tougaloo College	Omicron Pi	2009	Active
University of Puerto Rico at Aguadilla	Zeta Lambda	2009	Active
Utah State University	Omicron Upsilon	2009	Active
Washington & Lee University	Phi Xi	2009	Active
Winston-Salem State University	Nu Zeta	2009	Active
Albright College	Rho Delta	2010	Active
Azusa Pacific University	Epsilon Gamma	2010	Active
California State University, Monterey Bay	Phi Beta	2010	Active
Centenary University	Omega Rho	2010	Active
Chapman University	Epsilon Mu	2010	Active
Fairleigh Dickinson University Florham Campus	Omega Iota	2010	Active
High Point University	Phi Zeta	2010	Active
Metropolitan Community College Maple Woods	Lambda Club	2010	Active
Regis University	Epsilon Xi	2010	Active
Saint Michael's College (VT)	Omicron Omicron	2010	Active
San Jose State University	Epsilon Alpha	2010	Active
Southwest Mississippi Community College	Mu Beta Mu Club	2010	Active
University of Arkansas – Fort Smith	Omicron Omega	2010	Active
University of Iowa	Omicron Rho	2010	Active
Georgia Gwinnett College	Chi Lambda	2011	Active
Gordon College (Georgia)	Tau Alpha Tau	2011	Active
Houston Baptist University	Iota Omicron	2011	Active
Millikin University	Iota Epsilon	2011	Active
Oakwood University	Lambda Upsilon	2011	Active
South Carolina State University	Alpha Upsilon	2011	Active
Union University	Kappa Alpha Kappa	2011	Active
University of Dallas	Epsilon Tau	2011	Active
University of Findlay	Theta Sigma	2011	Active
University of Mary Hardin–Baylor	Mu Eta Beta	2011	Active
University of St. Francis	Gamma Kappa	2011	Active
Dallas Baptist University	Omicron Kappa	2012	Active
Dalton State College	Beta Chi Nu	2012	Active
Emmanuel University	Tau Beta Tau	2012	Active
Florida Gulf Coast University	Tau Beta	2012	Active
Macalester College	Iota Phi	2012	Active
Manchester University (Indiana)	Xi Alpha Xi	2012	Active
Saint Vincent College (PA)	Upsilon Gamma	2012	Active
Shenandoah University	Tau Chi Tau	2012	Active
Stark State College	Xi Zeta Club	2012	Active
University of Puerto Rico at Carolina	Zeta Mu	2012	Active
University of South Carolina Aiken	Mu Nu	2012	Active
Auburn University Montgomery	Mu Alpha	2013	Active
Centenary College of Louisiana	Nu Delta Nu	2013	Active
Central Christian College of Kansas	Iota Alpha Iota	2013	Active
Curry College	Chi Alpha Chi	2013	Active
Ferrum College	Beta Iota Omega	2013	Active
Indiana University South Bend	Xi Beta Xi	2013	Active
Indiana University of Pennsylvania	Omega Theta	2013	Active
Mars Hill University	Kappa Beta Alpha	2013	Active
Rockland Community College	Upsilon Iota Club	2013	Active
Saint John Fisher University	Upsilon Rho	2013	Active
Saint Petersburg College	Tau Delta Tau	2013	Active
Texas A&M University–Victoria	Nu Gamma Nu	2013	Active
University of Jamestown	Iota Beta Iota	2013	Active
Wabash College	Chi Beta Chi	2013	Active
Wayne County Community College	Xi Alpha Club	2013	Active
Abraham Baldwin Agricultural College	Tau Delta Kappa	2014	Active
Ave Maria University	Tau Delta Gamma	2014	Active
Fontbonne University	Iota Delta Alpha	2014	Active
Las Positas College	Omicron Lambda Club	2014	Active
Miami Dade College Interamerican Campus	Tau Delta Iota	2014	Active
North Greenville University	Tau Delta Alpha	2014	Active
Northeastern University	Chi Delta Epsilon	2014	Active
Pennsylvania State University Altoona	Lambda Gamma Beta	2014	Active
Robert Morris University	Lambda Gamma Alpha	2014	Active
Rose-Hulman Institute of Technology	Xi Delta Alpha	2014	Active
Schreiner University	Nu Delta Beta	2014	Active
Spelman College	Tau Delta Chi	2014	Active
Trinity College	Chi Delta Alpha	2014	Active
University of Houston–Clear Lake	Nu Delta Alpha	2014	Active
Athens State University	Mu Kappa Beta	2015	Active
Bemidji State University	Pi Delta Alpha	2015	Active
Cazenovia College (School closed in 2023)	Rho Delta Beta	2015-2023	Inactive
Kutztown University of Pennsylvania	Upsilon Delta Alpha	2015	Active
New York Institute of Technology	Rho Delta Alpha	2015	Active
Nicholls State University	Mu Kappa Alpha	2015	Active
State University of New York at Farmingdale	Chi Delta Eta	2015	Active
Bergen Community College	Upsilon Upsilon Club	2016	Active
Concordia University Irvine	Epsilon Chi Delta	2016	Active
Indiana University East	Xi Delta Chi	2016	Active
Interamerican University of Puerto Rico, Guayama	Zeta Nu	2016	Active
Kean University Ocean	Rho Delta Chi	2016	Active
LaGrange College	Psi Lambda Alpha	2016	Active
Lipscomb University	Kappa Delta Alpha	2016	Active
Nassau Community College	Eta Epsilon Club	2016	Active
Nevada State College	Epsilon Chi Gamma	2016	Active
University of Nevada Reno	Epsilon Chi Iota	2016	Active
Pennsylvania State University	Theta Delta Chi	2016	Active
State University of New York at Albany	Upsilon Delta Beta	2016	Active
State University of New York at Cobleskill	Upsilon Delta Chi	2016	Active
Arcadia University	Theta Delta Theta	2017	Active
Colorado State University	Epsilon Chi Alpha	2017	Active
East Georgia State College	Tau Epsilon Tau	2017	Active
Ferris State University	Xi Chi Xi	2017	Active
Louisiana Tech University	Delta Alpha Delta	2017	Active
University of New Hampshire at Manchester	Theta Epsilon Theta	2017	Active
University of North Texas at Dallas	Delta Beta Delta	2017	Active
Penn State Schuylkill	Theta Chi Theta	2017	Active
Pontifical Catholic University of Puerto Rico at Mayaguez	Zeta Omicron	2017	Active
University of Puerto Rico at Arecibo	Zeta Phi	2017	Active
Saint Francis College	Chi Delta Gamma	2017	Active
Southern Utah University	Phi Alpha Phi	2017	Active
University of Alabama in Huntsville	Kappa Delta Beta	2018	Active
University of Arizona	Epsilon Chi Lambda	2018	Active
University of Bridgeport	Upsilon Delta Eta	2018	Active
University of California, Irvine	Epsilon Chi Kappa	2018	Active
Manchester Community College	Theta Epsilon Theta Club	2018	Active
North Carolina Central University	Tau Delta Mu	2018	Active
University of North Georgia Gainesville Campus	Tau Delta Lambda	2018	Active
Point University	Psi Alpha Psi	2018	Active
St. Edward's University	Alpha Tau Chi	2018	Active
State University of New York at Oswego	Rho Delta Epsilon	2018	Active
Texas A&M University–Texarkana	Delta Chi Delta	2018	Active
Virginia Commonwealth University	Kappa Delta Chi	2018	Active
Waldorf University	Iota Delta Beta	2018	Active
Westfield State University	Upsilon Delta Epsilon	2018	Active
Xavier University	Xi Delta Epsilon	2018	Active
Bryan College of Health Science	Gamma Delta Alpha	2019	Active
Eckerd College	Kappa Delta Epsilon	2019	Active
Lafayette College	Chi Chi	2019	Active
University of Louisville	Mu Kappa Chi	2019	Active
Miami Dade College North Campus	Eta Delta Alpha	2019	Active
University of New Haven	Lambda Gamma Beta	2019	Active
State University of New York at Binghamton	Chi Delta Iota	2019	Active
Southern Wesleyan University	Eta Delta Beta	2019	Active
University of South Carolina Upstate	Eta Delta Chi	2019	Active
Webster University	Gamma Delta Beta	2019	Active
