= Calle de la Candelaria =

Street in Mayagüez, Puerto Rico

Calle de la Candelaria (Candelaria Street, formerly McKinley Street) is the parallel street aside the Calle Méndez Vigo in the western Puerto Rico municipality of Mayagüez. It has a length of about 1.20 miles. The street is oriented west–east with traffic running one-way eastbound. At its start at Parque del Litoral begins running with one lane in west section, changing to two lanes in the middle section and finally one lane again after the road passes Mayagüez Main U.S. Post Office in downtown Mayagüez.

In this street are located some of the most important historical places as: Edificio de la Aduana, Fundición Simón Carlo, Parque Suau, Correo Central de Mayagüez, Escuela David Farragut, Teatro Yagüez, Centro Cultural Baudilio Vega Berríos, Alcaldía de Mayagüez, Plaza Colón and Catedral Nuestra Señora de la Candelaria.

== History of the name ==
The street is named after Virgin of Candelaria, honored as saint patron of Mayagüez. Its name was changed after the American occupation of Mayaguez during the Puerto Rican Campaign of the Spanish–American War, when was renamed McKinley Street in honor of the U.S. president who governed during the invasion of Puerto Rico.

In recent years after renaming the former Post Street as Calle Ramón Emeterio Betances, the Municipality of Mayagüez ordinances giving back to McKinley Street its original Spanish-era name of Candelaria.

== See also ==
- List of highways in Puerto Rico
