= Calle Ramón Emeterio Betances =

Urban road in Puerto Rico

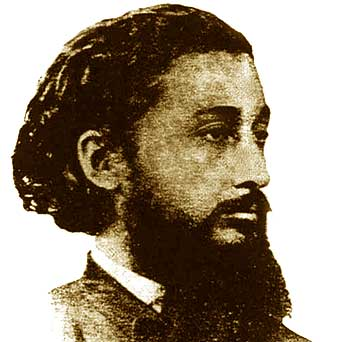
Dr. Ramón Emeterio Betances

Calle Ramón Emeterio Betances (Dr. Ramón Emeterio Betances Street) is the longest urban road in Mayagüez, serving as the Main Street of Mayagüez. It corresponds with the former Post Street's south of Yagüez River section.

== Urban landscape ==
The Ramón Emeterio Betances Street starts at the Barcelona Gate of the University of Puerto Rico at Mayagüez (UPRM) where a flagpole is placed with the Puerto Rican flag aside a José De Diego iron bust. It states that the Recinto Universitario de Mayagüez (as UPRM is named officially in Spanish) was founded as Colegio de Agricultura y Artes Mecánicas (CAAM) by José De Diego on September 23, 1911.

Just facing the UPRM's Barcelona Gate is a junction where merges the Avenida Alfonso Valdés Cobián and Pedro Albizu Campos Avenue aside with the Parque de los Próceres. In this point the road runs over a 6-lane bridge over the Yagüez River going southbound to Barcelona Sector, where some fast foods, a gas station, shops and pubs like the legendary El Garabato are located. The Radiocentro Building is located next, marking the entrance to Calle Bosque ("Forest Street", a student gathering social zone, where are located many college student's lodgings and apartments buildings).

Going south way, the Ramón Emeterio Betances Street passes the Calle Los Millonarios ("Millionaires Street", now named Calle Ramón Sánchez Justiniano) which marks the entrance to former Hacienda Guenard and the beginning of the historical downtown zone. Here is placed the Hospital San Antonio, founded by Dr. Ramón Emeterio Betances in 1865 with citizen fund-raising. Near is located the Hospital Perea (old Brothers Perea's Clinic) and El Cacique lounge.

At intersection with José De Diego Street are located two private colleges: Colegio Presbiteriano Pablo Casasús and the catholic Academia de La Milagrosa (Academy of Our Lady of Miracles). In the grounds of the Pablo Casasús College is placed the historical Iglesia Central Presbiteriana and at its entrance is located El Quenepo (a landmark tree facing intersection with Mendez Vigo Street) used to divide Mayagüez downtown streets in North, South, East and West. At El Quenepo junction the "Mayagüez Urbano" (Urban Mayagüez) público cars generally turns southbound on their service route along the Ramón Emeterio Betances Street in way to Mayagüez Mall.

Across the Méndez Vigo, Candelaria, Ernesto Ramos Antonini, Santiago R. Palmer and Luis Muñoz Rivera streets is the busiest commercial zone of the Mayagüez city center. From here is easy come to the Plaza de Colón with the municipal complex of Teatro Yagüez, Centro Cultural Baudilio Vega Berríos and the Alcaldia de Mayagüez.

Between the Luis Muñoz Rivera and San Vicente streets is the Casa de Betances ("Betances House"), where was placed the home of Dr. Betances in Mayagüez during the cholera epidemic of 1856.

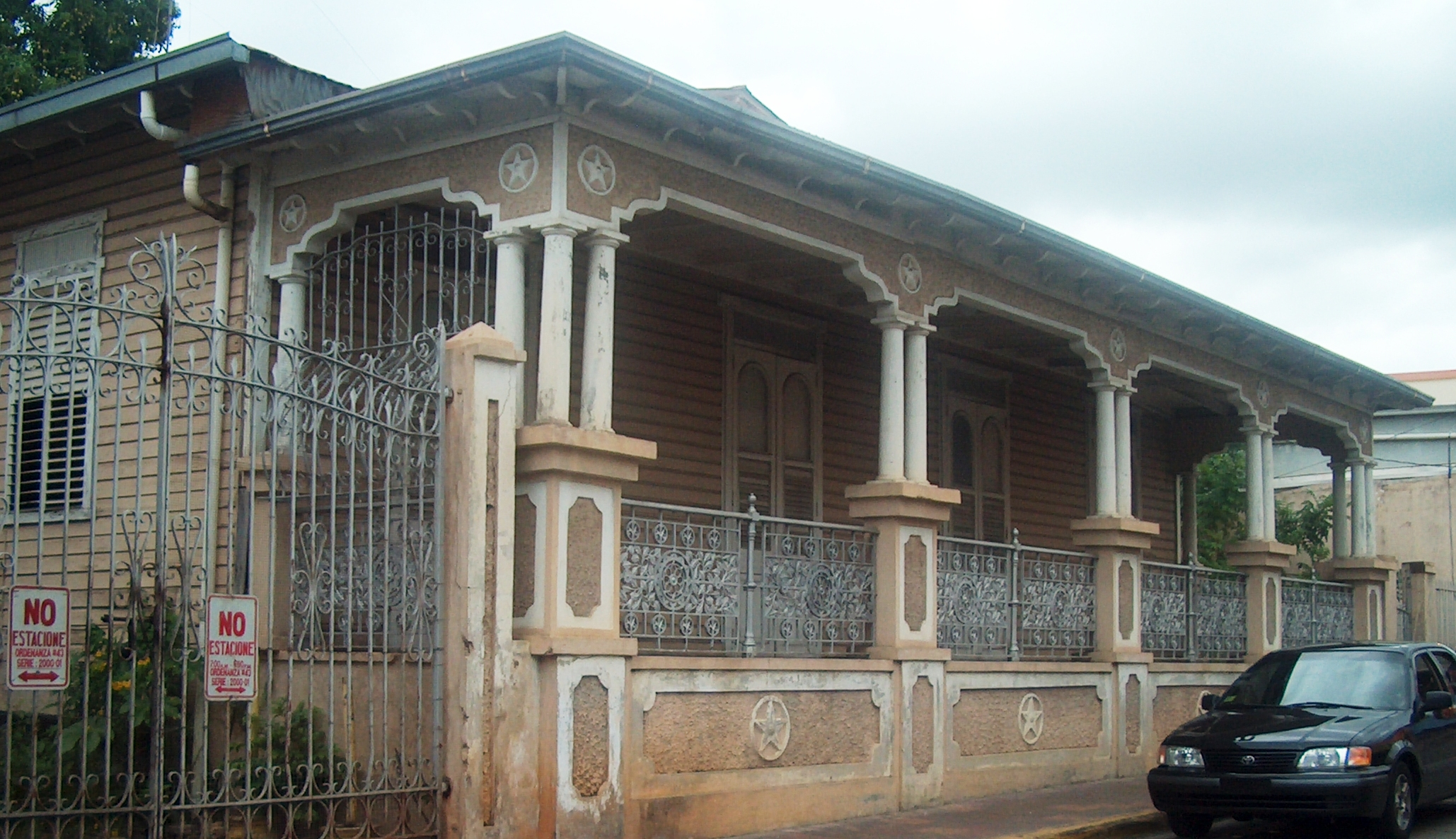
Betances House, 2007

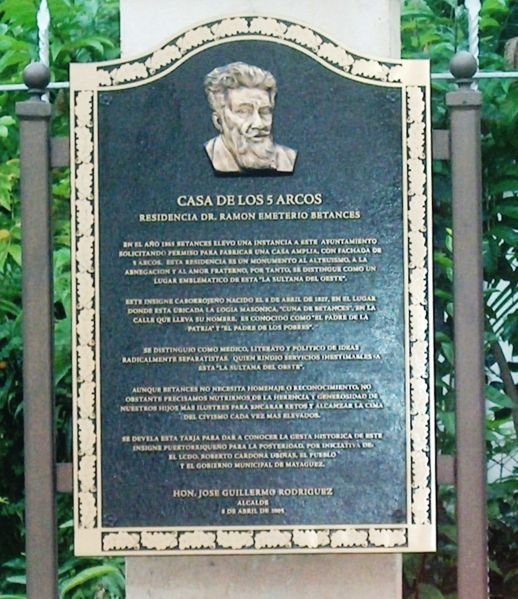
Plaque at Betances House, 2007

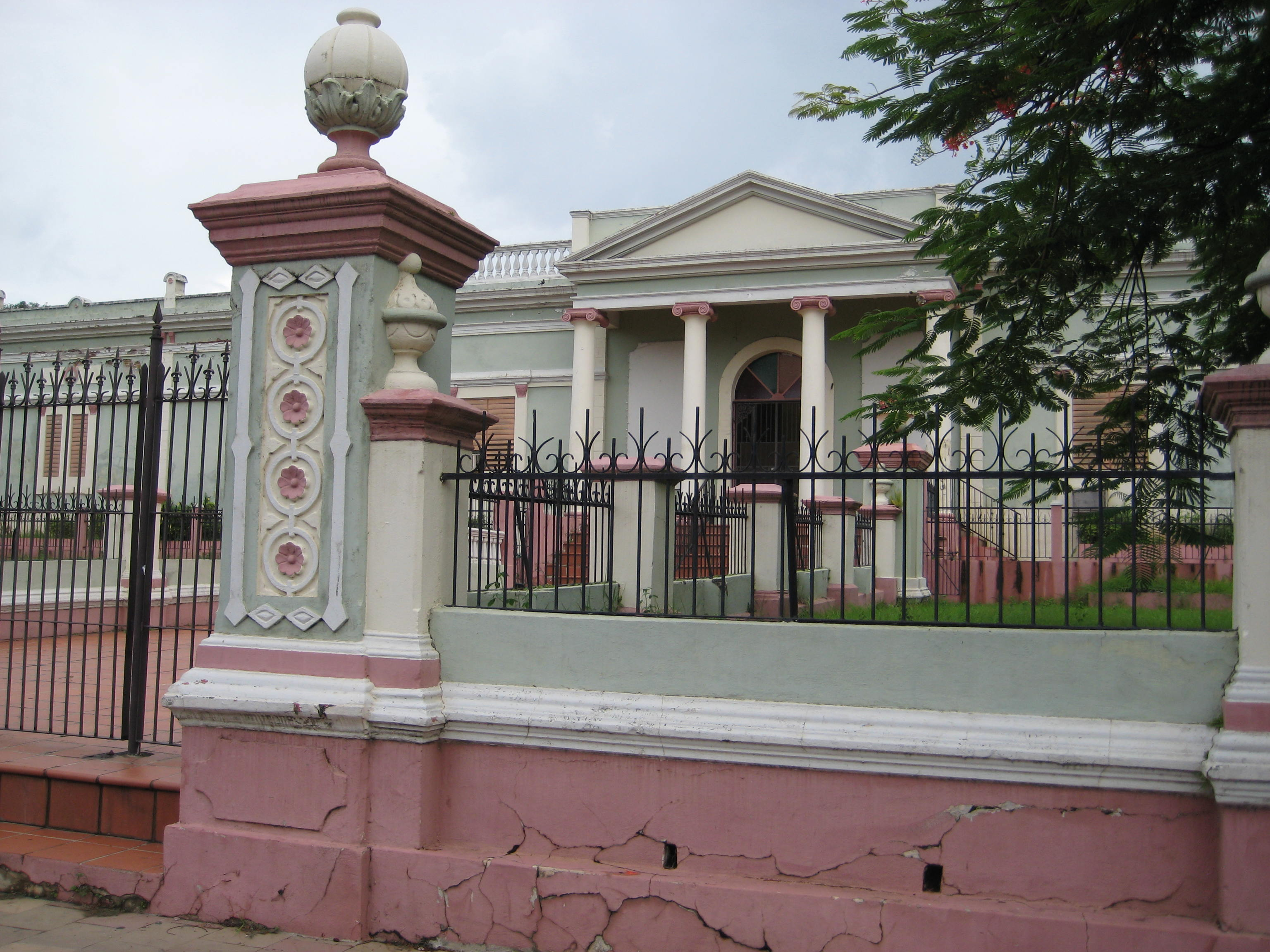
Old Municipal Asylum, 2010

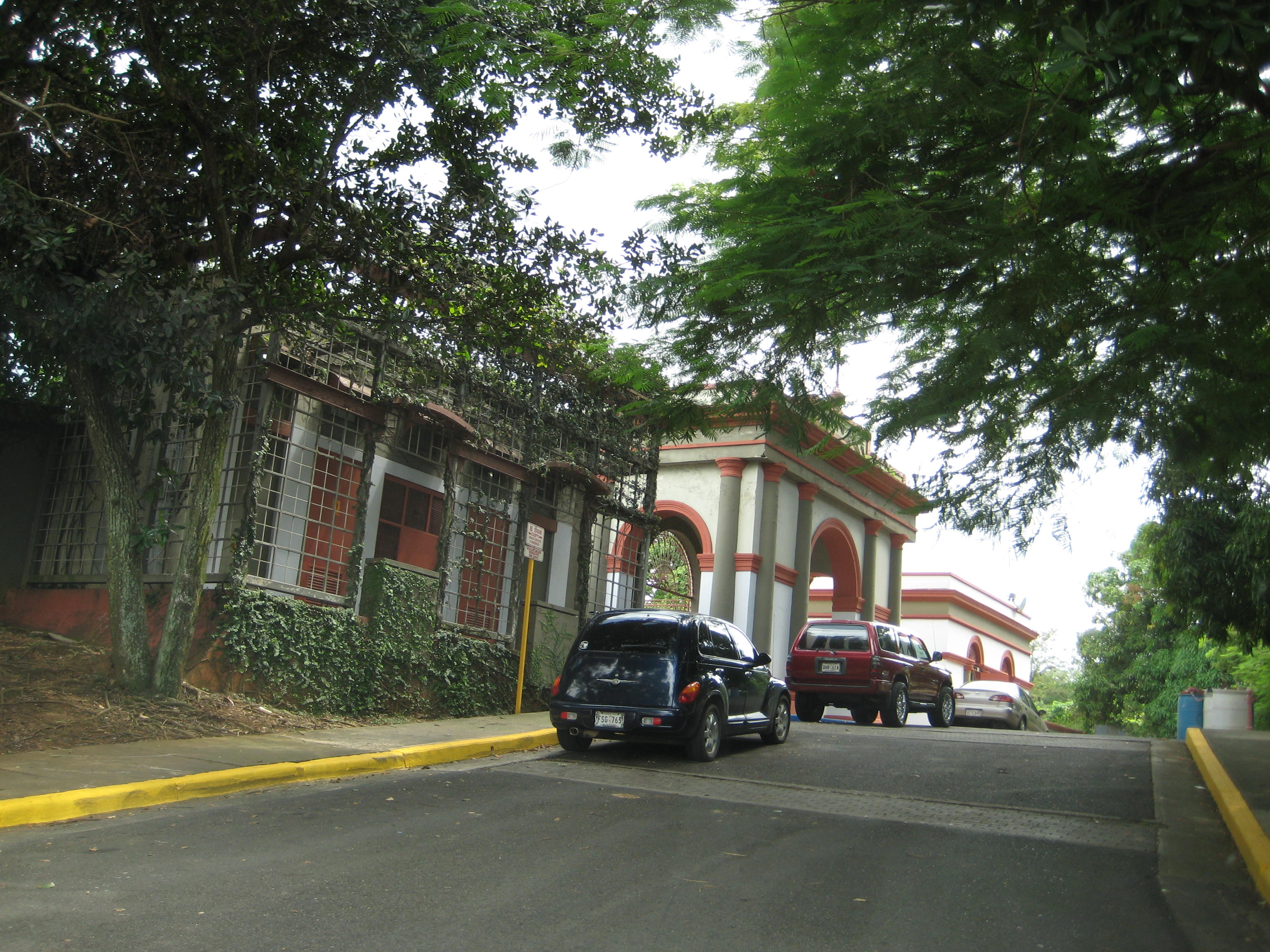
Old Municipal Cemetery, 2010

The intersection with San Vicente Street marks the southern end of the historical downtown zone and the entrance to a zone of low-density commercial zone with old warehouses, the former Teatro San José, the intersection with Nenadich Street next to Centro Gubernamental and the entrances to Buena Vista and Colombia sectors, the Asilo de Ancianos, the Municipal Sport and Recreation Department (Matadero Municipal) and the Old Municipal Cemetery.

Just at this cemetery is the junction with Hiram David Cabassa Street, where the Ramón Emeterio Betances Street climb a hill where is the Belmonte urbanization, the Funeraria Martell, Cementerio Vivaldi and the junction with PR-348 road (the entrance to Cuesta de las Piedras Housing Project). Next is placed the entrance to Río Cristal clusters, and forward are placed the Escuela Superior José De Diego (now a closed high school building) and the Pontifical Catholic University of Puerto Rico at Mayagüez.

After the PUCPR are the entrance to some residential zones, the Channel 3 studios, the former Escuela Libre de Música Ernesto Ramos Antonini building, the Jardines de Mayagüez Housing Project and after crossing a creek, the Barriada Nadal community at Calle Carolina (now named 65th Infantry Regiment Street).

The final section of the Ramón Emeterio Betances Street is through the Poblado Sábalos, reaching this street its finish in a junction with Avenida Corazones (now named Ramón Arbona Avenue) in Sábalos ward. Near here is the southern hub of PR-2 where are placed nearby the DTOP/CESCO regional offices, the Police of Puerto Rico regional headquarters (Comandancia de la Policia Estatal - Área de Mayagüez), the new municipal cemetery and a shopping center.

This street was named by disposition of the Municipal Legislative as a homage to the independence advocate and abolitionist leader Dr. Ramón Emeterio Betances.

== See also ==
- List of highways in Puerto Rico
