= Museo de Arqueología de la Pontificia Universidad Católica de Puerto Rico =

Museum of Archaeology of the Pontifical Catholic University of Puerto Rico
- Museo de Arqueología de la Pontificia Universidad Católica de Puerto Rico
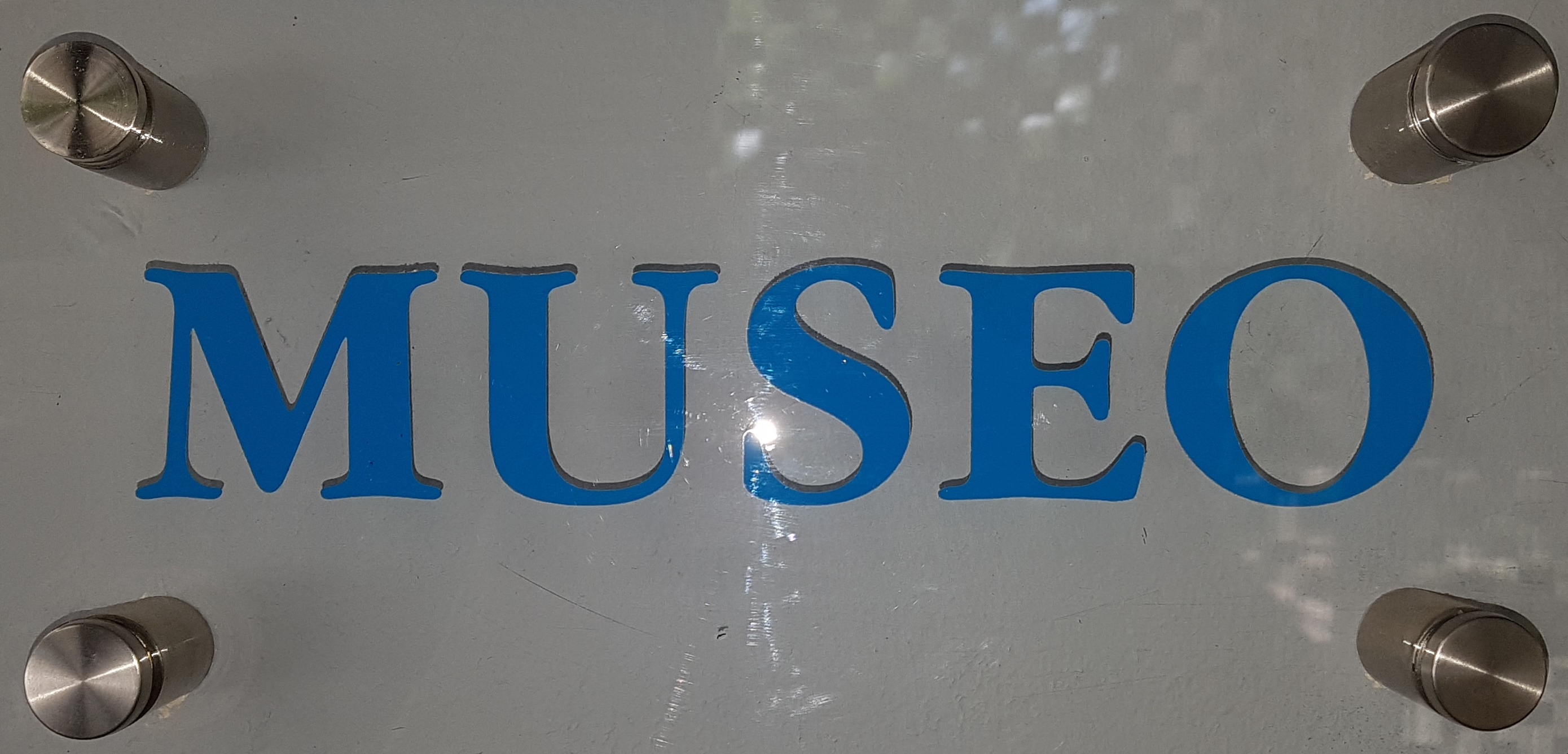
- Plaque at the entrance to the museum

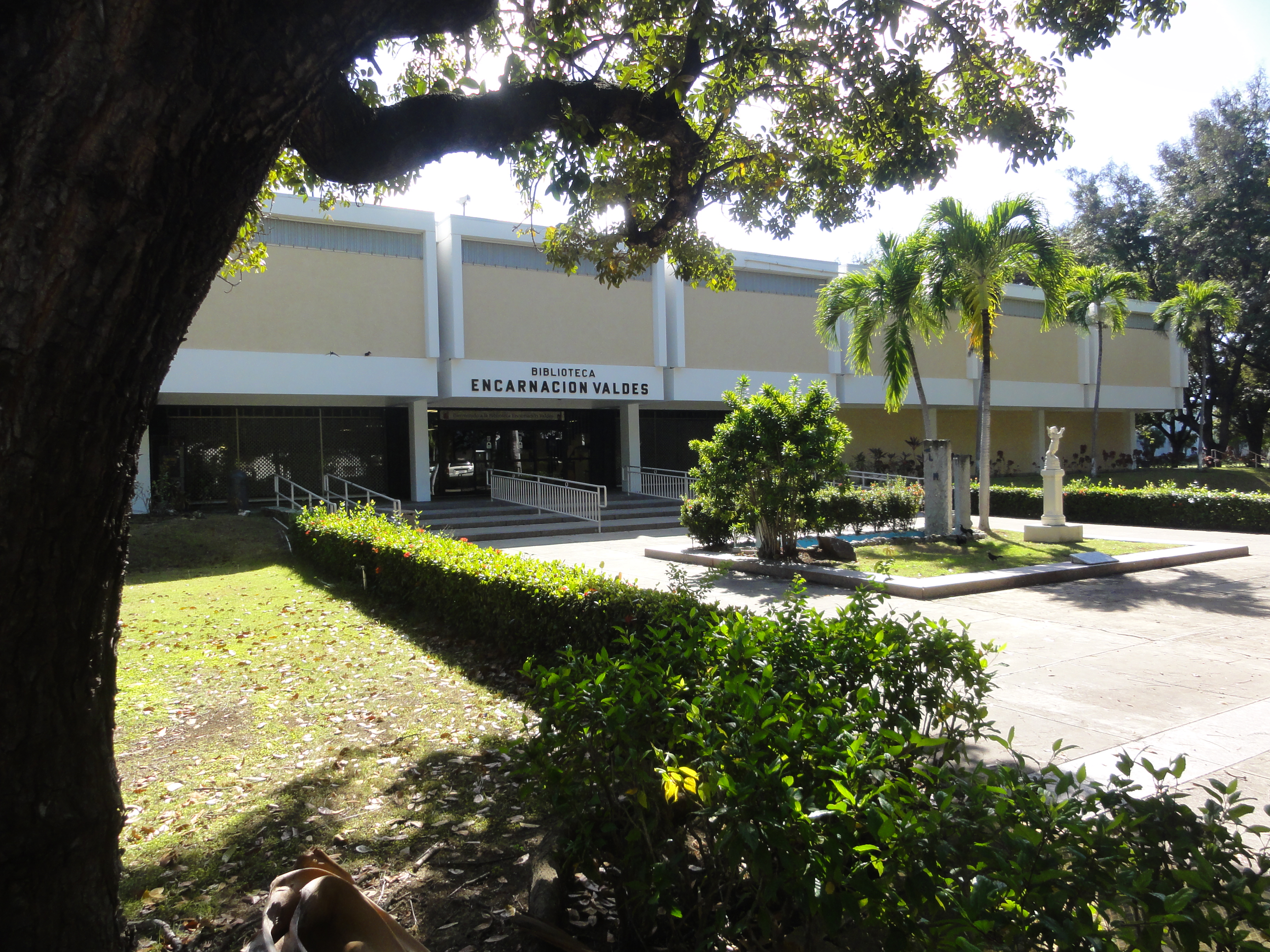
- Building that houses the museum

- Location within Puerto Rico
- Former name: Museo Arqueológico
- Established: 6 December 1972; 20 November 1980 (Re-established)
- Location: Biblioteca Encarnación Valdés, PUCPR, Avenida Las Américas; Ponce, Puerto Rico
- Coordinates: 18°0′14″N 66°37′1″W
- Type: Archaeology museum
- Key holdings: Viví Archaeological Site, Bo. Viví Arriba, Utuado, El Bronce Archaeological Site, Bo. Portugués, Ponce, Canas Archaeological Site, Bo. Canas, Ponce
- Collections: Taino, Pre-Taino, Igneri, El Bronce
- Collection size: 10,000+
- Visitors: 12,000 (Note: This figure is based on the university's student population)
- Founders: Dr. Enrique Laguerre. Co-founders: Antonio Matos Marques, and Francisco J. Carreras
- Executive director: Juan Manuel Ledesma Criado (Emeritus)
- Director: Antonio Matos
- Director: Head Librarian
- President: Dr. Jorge Iván Vélez Arocho
- Curators: Carmen "Mela" Pons; Ana Basso Bruno; Luis A. Rodriguez Gracia
- Historian: Luis A. Rodriguez Gracia
- Owner: Pontifical Catholic University of Puerto Rico
- Public transit access: SITRAS, Parada Museo de Arte
- Parking: Street parking
- Website: www.pucpr.edu%20www.pucpr.edu

The Museo de Arqueología de la Pontificia Universidad Católica de Puerto Rico (Museum of Archaeology of the Pontifical Catholic University of Puerto Rico) is a museum of archaeology located at the Pontificia Universidad Católica de Puerto Rico (PUCPR) main campus on Avenida Las Américas in Ponce, Puerto Rico. The museum is an educational unit of the Pontifical Catholic University of Puerto Rico's Biblioteca Encarnación Valdés, the university's main library. It has a collection of more than 10,000 artifacts from the past civilizations of Puerto Rico, including Igneri, Pre-Taíno, and Taíno cultures. In addition to displaying its permanent and special exhibitions, the museum also guards numerous other artifacts which are currently not on display due to its space limitations.

== History ==
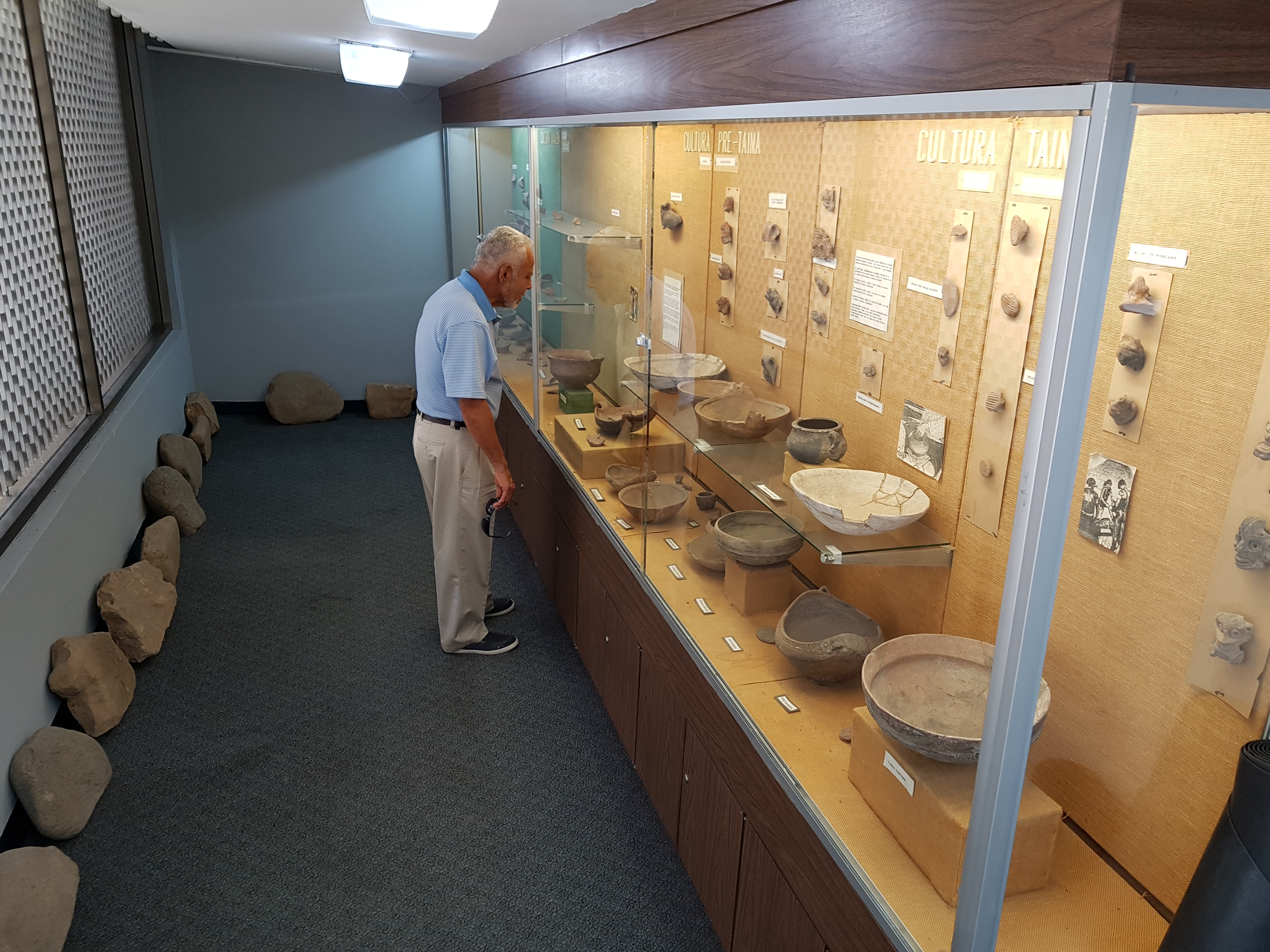
A patron checks out artifacts at the Museo de Arqueología at Pontificia Universidad Católica de Puerto Rico

In 1971, when Dr. Enrique Laguerre was head of the PUCPR's Department of Hispanic Studies, there was developing interest in creating a program on Puerto Rican Studies at the university. It was out of this interest that the first course on archaeology was created. It was also during this embryonic stages that the idea of creating a museum of archaeology at the university stated to take shape.

Perhaps the earliest published records about this museum was made in 1973 and appeared in the Ateneo de Ponce's "SUR: Boletín del Ateneo de Ponce", volume 1, issue 2, page 12. In it, the author describes it as "a room with glass cabinets, relieve maps, remains and utensils of the ancient, the Igneris, and the Taino cultures of our Island". To augment its exposure to the study of archaeology, the university contracted with Dr. Ricardo Alegría who taught a course on archaeology in 1973–74 academic year. This offering with continued, upon Dr. Alegría's departure, by Professor Juan Manuel Ledesma Criado, who taught the course for two additional years. It was then that with the help of Mela Pons de Alegría, Ricardo Alegría, Juan Gonzalez, Luis A. Rodriguez Gracia, and several donors, Dr. Enrique Laguerre accomplished his dream of opening the museum.

During the 1970s, the museum held collections obtained from the Instituto de Cultura Puertorriqueña, pieces from the Mr. Herman Ferre's private collection, Santos from Dr. Luis F. Sala, archaeological discoveries donated by the Sociedad Guaynia de Arqueología e Historia, and miscellaneous donations from students and friends of the university, and for several years ran under the supervision of university professor Juan Manuel Ledesma Criado.

Regretfully, the rapid growth of the university in terms of its student enrollment made it necessary to expropriate the area where the museum operated and turn it into a classroom for the university's English Language Institute. As a result, the museum was dismantled, with the archaeological material sent to storage and the exhibits put under the supervision of the university library.

To provide continuity to the museum, Antonio Matos, the university librarian, arranged for the creation of two large glass displays at the library, thus creating the University Museum as an integral part of the library. The endeavor had the concurrence of university president Francisco Carreras, who also approved the allocation of approximately $12,000 ($59,235 in 2025 dollars) towards the project. Meanwhile, a batey was discovered in the mountain town of Utuado and, upon concurrence of university president Dr. Francisco J. Carreras, was brought in and annexed to the museum on the grounds next to the library.

The collection was augmented from donations by Herman Ferre, the brother of the former governor of Puerto Rico. This addition consisted of artifacts found at the Cañas archaeological site. Antonio Blasini also donated life-like replicas of various indigenous pieces. The completion of these bateys and the museum vitrines brought about the re-inauguration of the museum on 20 November 1980 under the supervision of head librarian Antonio Matos Vazquez, and this is how the museum stands today (2020). Not long afterwards, the museum display area was enlarged to occupy areas underneath the library staircases that lead to the library's second floor. Two models were created, one for each area under the two staircases. In one of them, indigenous are shown enjoying a ball game; in the other simulates a burial in a cave.

In the mid-1980s, Mr. Luis A. Rodriguez Gracia and Dr. Luis E. Diaz Hernandez engaged in the arduous and time-consuming task of cleaning, identifying, categorizing and, in general, curating the entirety of the collection not on display. The result of their work culminated in the publication of several reports, among them the voluminous "Curación y Conservación del Material Arqueológico del Sitio El Bronce, Ponce, Puerto Rico." This report, published in 1987, and submitted to the university president, Rev. P. Tosello Giangiacomo, contained, among other specifics, a complete register of every item in the collections, the personnel involved in its identification, the location of each item as discovered as well as its current location at the university, and the methodology followed in the curation process. The items are classified in 6 areas: ceramics, bones, shells, soil samples, samples for Carbon-14 analysis, and rocks. Close to 200 pages are dedicated to the inventory alone. Also included is a full bibliography and close to a dozen appendixes.

=== Highlights ===
In 2010, Luis A. Rodriguez Gracia, after more than three decades as museum curator and historian, published a 6-page manuscript detailing the history of the museum and its collection. The following are highlights of this reports:

- Prof. Mela Posn de Alegria, designed the 1971 showcases for the original museum as well as its museography
- Prof. Ana Basso Bruno (Dept of Fine Arts) decorated the walls with indigenous themes
- Dr. Ricardo Alegria brought the first pieces into the museum consisting of a human burial
- The original museum boasted decorated amulets (Spanish: cemies), axes, collars, mixed ceramics samples, among others
- The first artifacts included specimens from the lithic, petaloid, saladoid, elenoid, and capa periods
- The original museum operated under the university's History Department
- The museum had a significant role in motivating students into the formation of today's (2020) Sociedad Guaynia de Arqueología e Historia (Guaynia Archaeology and History Society)
- The museum was the venue for Caribbean basin symposiums and workshops by the likes of Marcio Veloz Maggiolo, Dr. Ripley P. Bullen, Dr. Irving Rouse (Yale U.), Dr. Clifford Evans (Smithsonian), Dr. Betty Jane Meggers (Smithsonian), and Gordon Willey (Harvard).
- Fundación Puertorriqueña de las Humanidades was strong a financial supporter, and the Puerto Rico Office of Historic Preservation provided logistical support.

== Collection ==
The museum's permanent exhibition is on display in the first floor of the university's Biblioteca Encarnación Valdés. Among its collections are:

- Archaeological pieces donated by the Instituto de Cultura Puertorriqueña
- Mr. Herman Ferre's private Barrio Canas deposits, belonging to the ceramic styles of Hacienda Grande and Hacienda Cuevas
- Dr. Luis F. Sala's private wooden Santos (Santos de palo) collection
- Sociedad Guaynía de Arqueología e Historia Inc.
- Don Antonio Blasini's private collection, consisting of copies of indigenous pieces

Among the museum's most significant holdings are:

- Some 2,500 daily-life objects from the Igneri culture
- Close to 4,000 items of Taíno pottery
- Nearly 1,000 provenance glass fragments and vessels
- Over 400 Taíno inscriptions
- A collection of Taíno burials

== Fieldwork ==
The museum has conducted fieldwork for over 40 years. Its past excavations and other fieldwork have taken place at the following archaeological sites:

- El Bronce, Ponce: Dr. Gary Vescelius, 1987
- Barrio Canas, Ponce: c. 1985
- Barrio Vivi Arriba, Utuado: c. 1985

== See also ==
- J. L. Montalvo Guenard. Rectificaciones históricas: El descubrimiento de Borinquen. Ponce, P.R. : Editorial del Llano, 1933.
- Cirilo Toro Vargas. Archaeology of the Americas, a Bibliography.

== Additional Reading ==
- Fay Fowlie de Flores. Ponce, Perla del Sur: Una Bibliográfica Anotada. Second Edition. 1997. Ponce, Puerto Rico: Universidad de Puerto Rico en Ponce. p. 262. Item 1314. LCCN 92-75480
