= Casilla del Caminero (Mayagüez) =

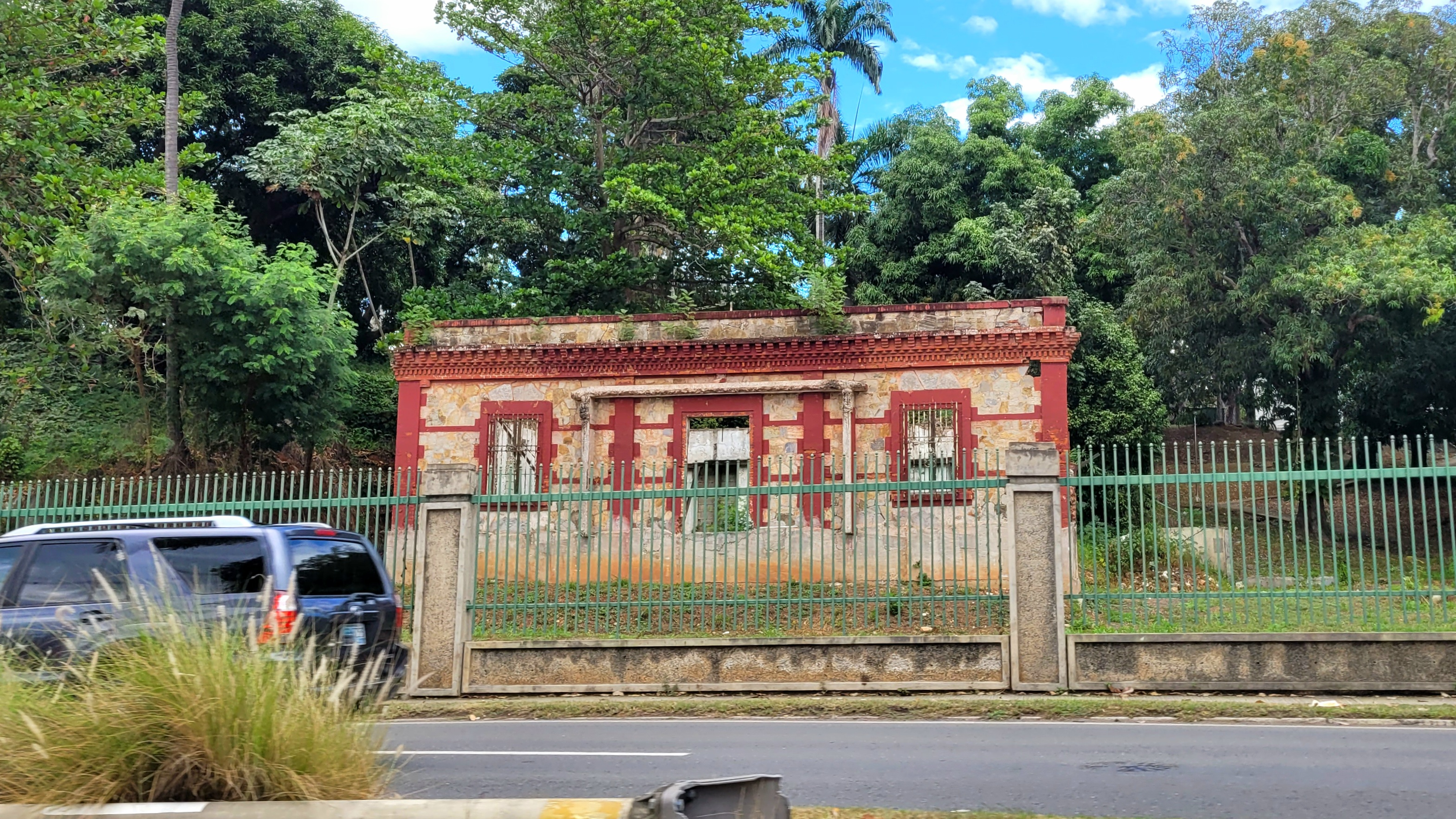
- View of the Casilla del Caminero from Puerto Rico Highway 2R
- Interactive map of the Casilla del Caminero area
- Alternative names: Casa del Peón Caminero Casilla del Caminero

General information
- Location: University of Puerto Rico at Mayagüez, Mayagüez, Puerto Rico
- Coordinates: 18.20825°N 67.142095°W
- Current tenants: Abandoned
- Completed: 1883
- Owner: University of Puerto Rico at Mayagüez

Technical details
- Floor count: 1

Design and construction
- Architect: Manuel Maese

The Casilla del Caminero is a 19th-century structure located in the University of Puerto Rico at Mayagüez.

== History ==
In the second-half of the 19th century, there was an expansion is the transportation system, both on the high seas and on land, to protect this routes lighthouses and casas de camineros (or road worker's homes), respectively, were built. The one in possession of the University of Puerto Rico at Mayagüez was built in 1883, after the engineer Manuel Maese had submitted his project for the section from Añasco to Mayagüez on 12 March 1882. This project only consisted of two houses, one in each municipality. Only the one in the campus survives, since the other one was a victim of road expansion."

The style of the casilla, designated as Style 2 by the university Biology professor, Dr. José A. Mari Mut, who did an exhaustive study of these homes. This style was a refinement of Style 1. All "the superior borders of the holes for the entry door and for all the windows are straight." The windows reached the foot of the structure, and the cornice surrounds it completely. Inside, "each room has its own door to the living room and the wall that divides them reaches the roof."

Its internal division into two parts corresponded to the fact that two road workers and their families lived there. Each road worker was responsible for three kilometres to each opposite side of the road from the structure.

The Casilla del Caminero, as the oldest structure in the campus is popularly called, suffered damage from the San Fermín earthquake, which occurred on 11 October 1918. Two years later, in 1920, the structure was repaired by installing "a system of internal rods screwed into exterior plates which tied and stabilized the walls." Additionally, "the shed wall was extended up using materials so alike to the original that in antique photographs it seems like an original wall; however, the project plan reveals that this is not the case." The "[C]asilla suffered more changes later, which included the addition of a portico of concrete, which was eliminated when the casilla was moved, and of an eave over a lateral window converted into a door," which was destroyed when a tree that was permitted to grow inside the Casilla collapsed as a result of the Hurricane María winds.

In the mid 1950s, the road workers program is shutdown and the structure comes to be an office for the Department of Transportation and Public Works (DTOP).

In 1988 the DTOP regional office was planning to transfer and agreed with the then-Rector of the camps, Dr. José L. Martínez Picó, so that the property would be restored by the campus to "give it practical use of interest to the Campus and to the People of Puerto Rico."

The 6 August 1994 the House of Representatives approved Joint Resolution 937, converting it in Number 433, whereby the structure was transferred, with 2,358.23 m^{2} of land (a previous version only delineated a plot of land of 2,067.822m^{2}), for the cost of $1.00 from DTOP to the campus. The campus had "an indispensable requirement...that if at any moment the Campus...did not have use for this property, the title would revert to the [DTOP]..."

In the first half of the decade of the 1990s, the Post Road, later to be named the Alfonso Valdés Cobián Boulevard (PR-2R), was expanded, and the structure was moved back from the road, adding the base cement and the transfer of the title of the property was completed.

In the Joint Resolution, the purpose of the structure was mentioned to be "for a museum or cultural purposes " and that "[n]obody better than the Campus...to be custodian of this asset of our national heritage."

== Timeline ==
Date	Events
12 March 1882	The engineer Manuel Maese submits for approval the plans for the section that goes from Añasco to Mayagüez, these include the construction of the casillas.
1883	The Casilla del Caminero is built.
11 October 1918	The San Fermín earthquake damages the structure.
1920	The structure is repaired with "a system of internal rods screwed into exterior plates which tied and stabilized the walls. Additionally the shed wall was extended upward..."
Subsequently	"[M]ore changes..., w which included the addition of a portico of concrete (eliminated when the casilla was moved) and of an eave over a lateral window converted into a door."
Mid 1950s	The roadworkers program ceases.
1988	The rector of the campus, Dr. José L. Martínez Picó, commits to restoring it.
1989	Agustín Echevarría, Esq. of the Institute of Puerto Rican Culture (ICP) endorses the transfer of the Casilla to the campus.
Early 1990s	DTOP transfes its offices and abandons the Casilla.
Subsequently	The Casilla is moved.
1993	Dr. Carmelo Delgado Cintrón endorses selling the Casilla to the campus.
2 March 1994	The campus states in a document to the House of Representatives that "it commits to guarantee the conservation of its value as a heritage of the country and its safety and adequate upkeep and use for cultural purposes as corresponds to a structure considered of historical interest."
6 October 1994	Joint Resolution Num. 443 is approved.
23 February 1996	Letter of Understanding between the campus, DTOP and the Highways and Transportation Authority (ACT) to exchange campus land for the Casilla property.
9 April 1997	Agreement is made "whereby Parcel 001-00 and Parcel 001-01, both property of RUM, are exchanged for the Parcel of the Caminero House, property of DTOP."
27 July 1998	Law Number 179, Senate Project 928, designating the panoramic route, which would start at the Casilla, with the official name of Luis Muñoz Marín.
2 September 1999	Letter from Mrs. Nelida García Torres de Miranda, Director of Internal Auditing of the Board of Trustees of the University of Puerto Rico, to the rector of the campus, Dr. Zulma Toro, mentioning to her that "the ACT still has not made the arrangements to pass the property title to the Campus..."
Subsequently	Casilla is transferred to the campus. Document was lost.
15 May 2002	The ICP sends a letter to the campus "in relation to the restoration and use" of the Casilla.
23 May 2002	Letter from the interim rector of the campus, Pablo Rodríguez, to the ICP. He details that they met "with the architect Jaime Cobas, on the purpose of restoring it and turning it, possibly into a museum."
10 June 2002	Letter from the Mayagüez regional office of the ICP to the ICP Director. Apparently, mistakenly refers to the interim rector as "Pablo Ramos" and the campus to that "of Río Piedras." Makes mention of "[t]he tight economy" of the campus and the conversations with the architect Jaime Cobas.
30 January 2003	DTOP presentation of the Panoramic Route "Luis Muñoz Marín", mentioning that the Casilla would be the "entrance portal of the west of the Route." $3,840,000 are assigned for the entire project.
27 August 2003	Letter from the ICP Director to the rector, Dr. Jorge Iván Vélez Arrocho, requesting "information about the situation and/or plans with the Casilla...and/or immediate future plan..." He mentions that there would be "the possibility that some civic organization would be willing to rehabilitate the structure for its use..." no matter the property title. The ICP would be thankful if the campus would let it know at the earliest possible time if it were no interested in its restoration.
7 October 2003	Letter from the rector, Dr. Vélez Arrocho, to the ICP mentioning the events of the following dates: 23 February 1996; 9 April 1997; 27 July 1998; 2 September 1999; 30 January 2003; Additionally he mentions that there is an "interest in reaching an agreement with DTOP" to use the Casilla as the "West Portal" and "[i]t would correspond to DTOP to assume responsibility of rehabilitating the edifice following all applications pertaining to historical buildings, according to the [ICP]."
2007	DTOP "had intentions of restoring and converting it into a Tourist Information Center."
7 August 2018	In the Dean of Administration's Annual Report, they stated that they had supported a students-led idea, who, as part of their course, suggested making the "area for food trucks right next to the [Casilla].
9 September 2019	The student council of the College of Arts and Sciences (ceFAC) of the campus approve a resolution for the prompt cleaning of the Casilla.
