= Casillas de Camineros =

Structures built by the Spanish government in Puerto Rico

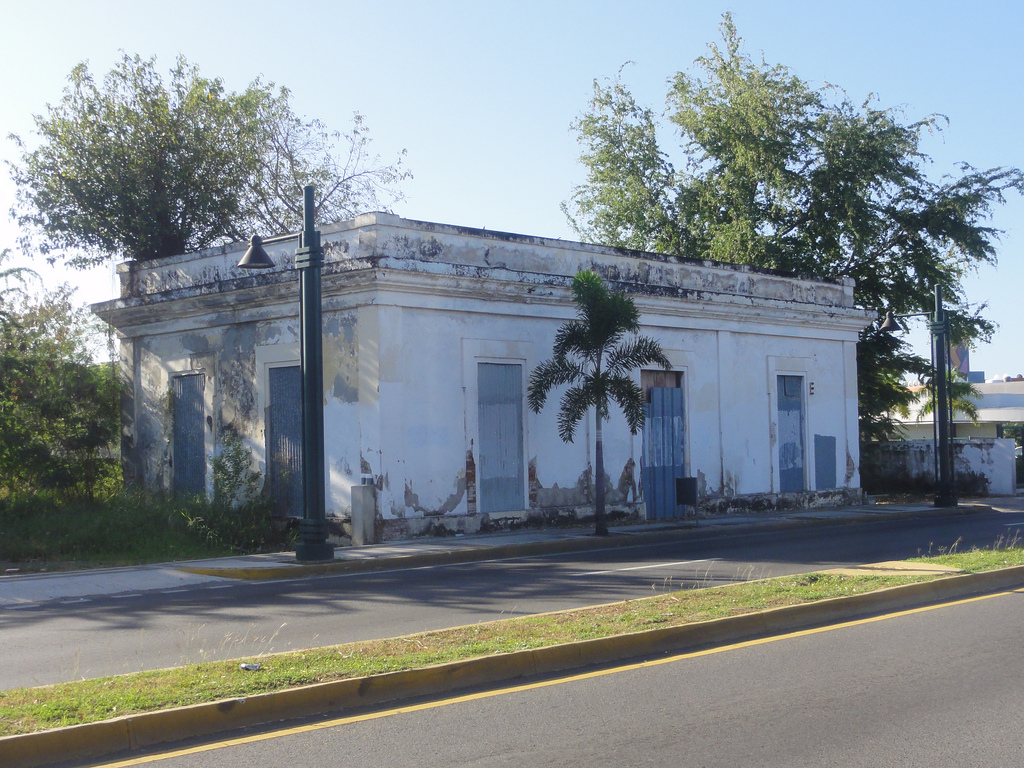
A former Casilla de Caminero on PR-14 (now Ave. Tito Castro) in Ponce, Puerto Rico. It was designed by Manuel Maese and built by Eduardo Armstrong in 1886.

Casillas de Camineros is the name in Spanish given to structures built every 6 kilometers during the latter part of the 19th century alongside the major roads built in Puerto Rico and provided as residences to the camineros, specially-trained government workers charged with providing maintenance to the surface of approximately six kilometers of a major road.

These Casillas de Camineros were built along five major routes: (1) the Mayagüez-Añasco road, (2) the Mayagüez-San Germán road, (3) the Ponce-Adjuntas road, (4) the Ponce-San Juan road, and (5) the Bayamón-Toa Baja road. Forty-seven casillas were built, all by the Spanish government in Puerto Rico. The road with the largest number of casillas was the Ponce-San Juan road, then known as Carretera Central; it had 33 casillas. The casilla on Avenida Tito Castro in Ponce was designed by Manuel Maese and built by Eduardo Armstrong in 1886.

Abandoned in the latter part of the 20th century, the structures have faced different fates. Many of them have deteriorated or been demolished. Others have been put to other uses.

== Gallery ==
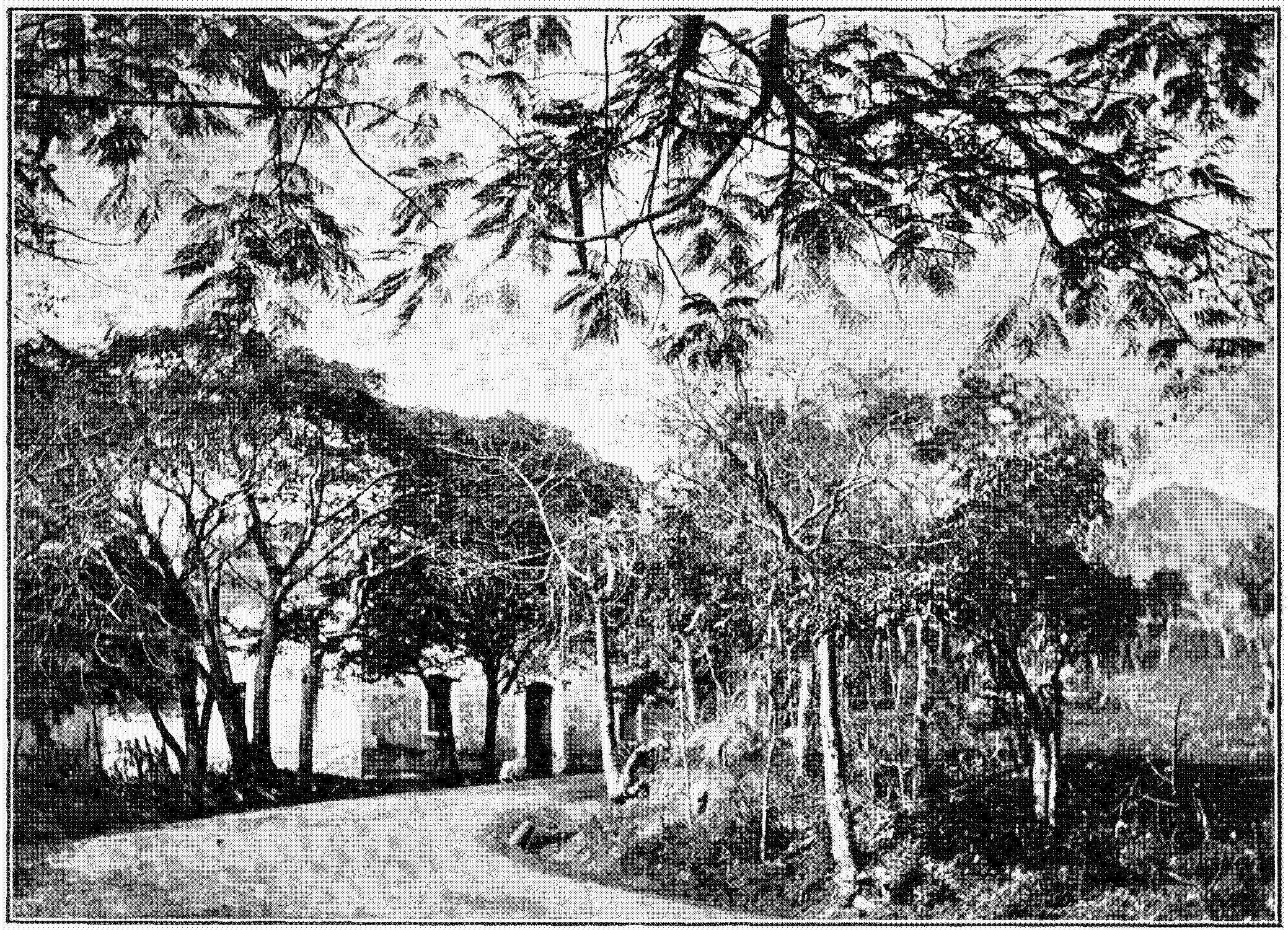
Casilla # 10 during the Spanish-American War in 1898

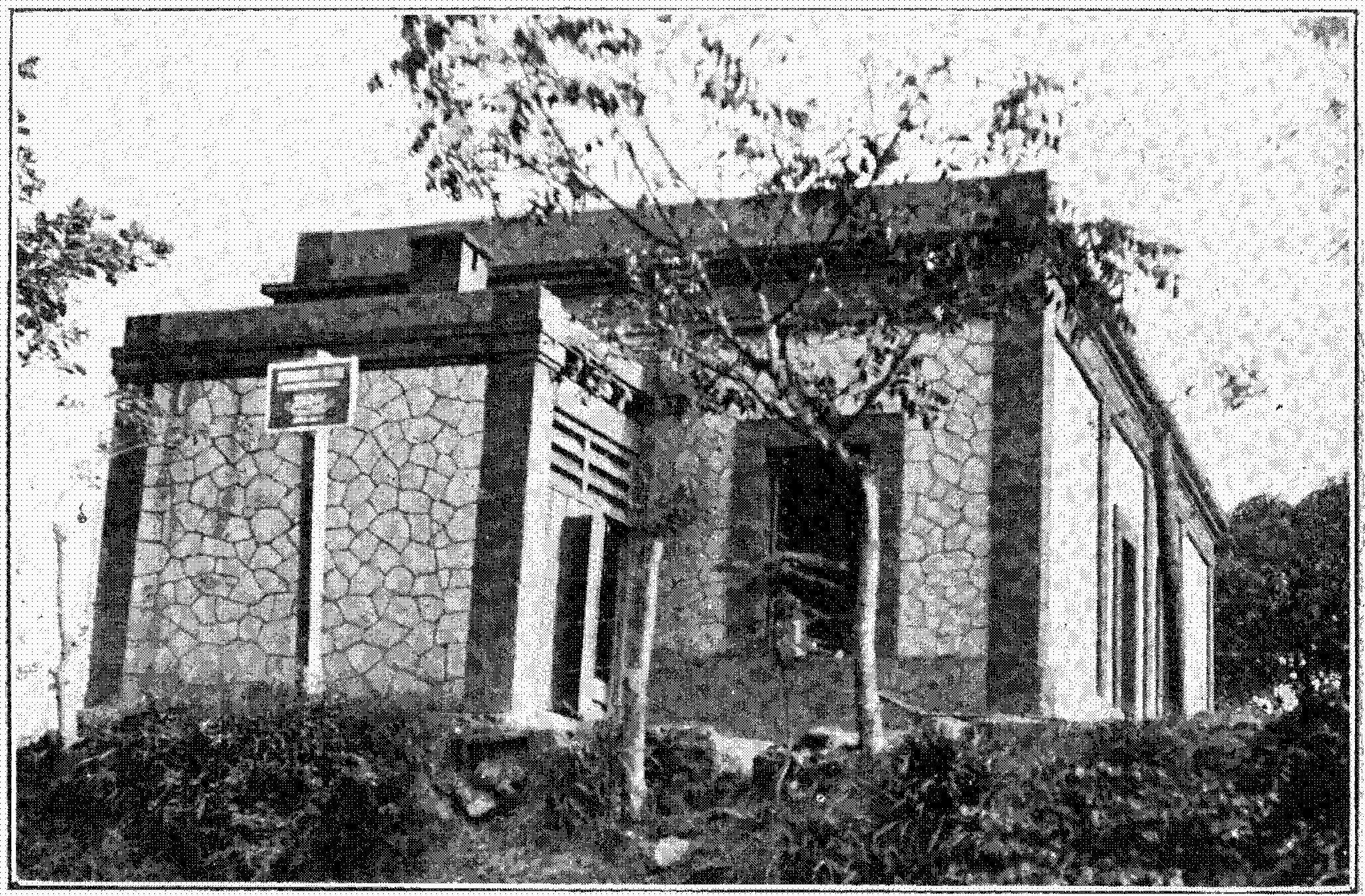
Casilla with windows on all four sides

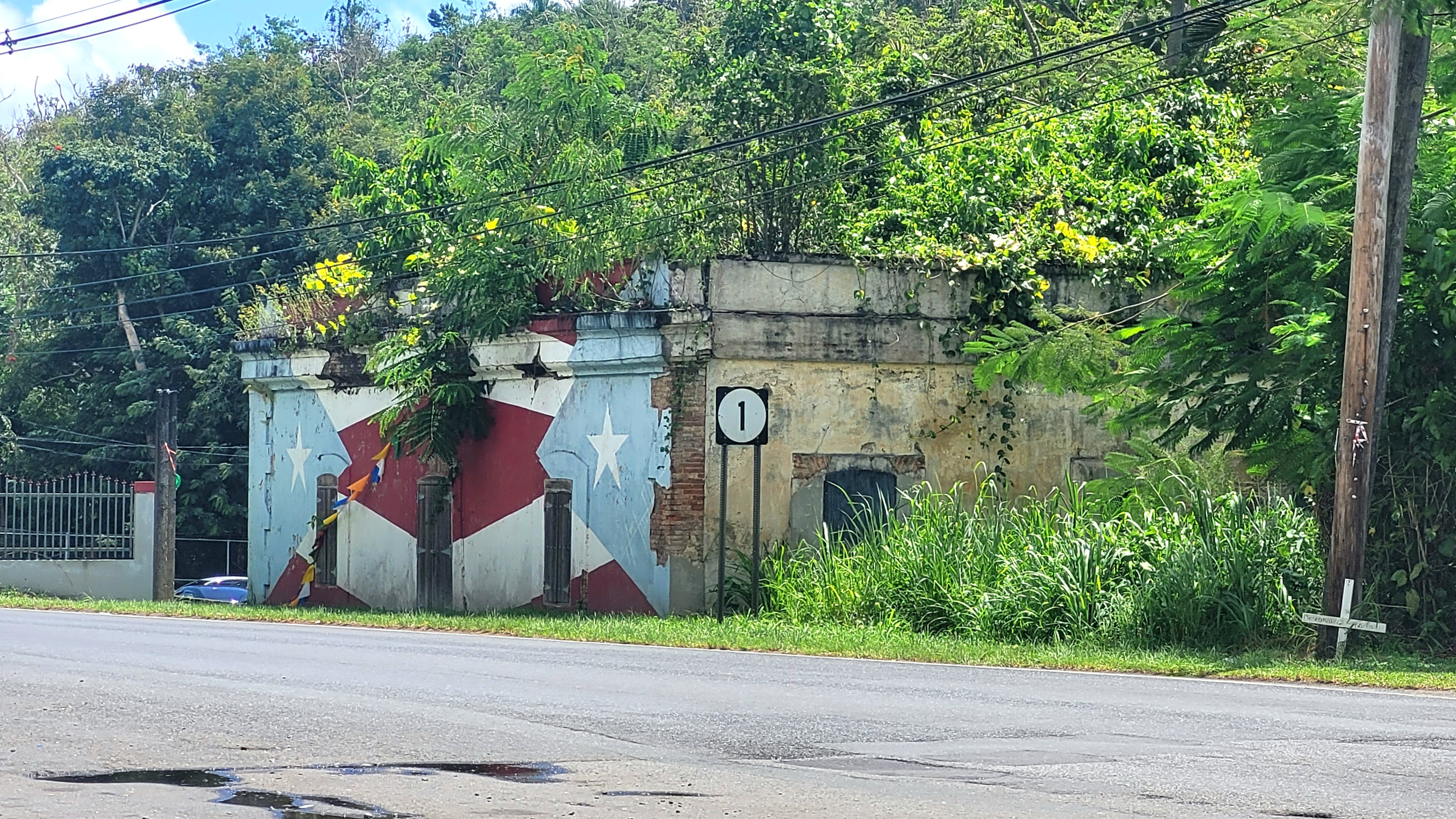
Casilla # 15 on PR-1 in Caguas

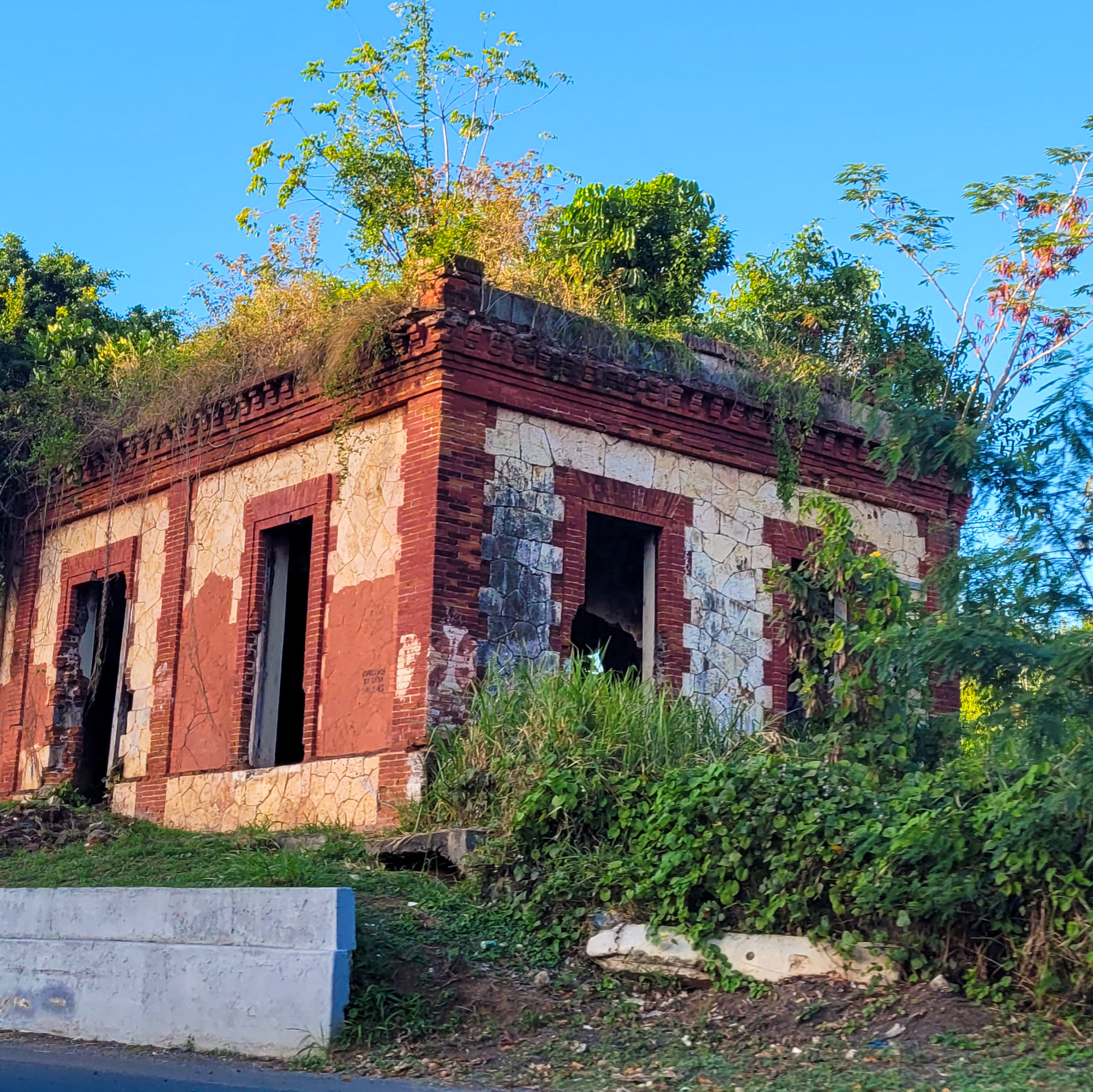
Casilla # 2 on PR-2 in Toa Baja

== See also ==
- Casilla del Caminero (Mayagüez)
