= Ateneo de Ponce =

Nonprofit, civic, non governmental organization located in Ponce, Puerto Rico

- Logo of Ateneo de Ponce
- Founded: 15 September 1956 (age 70)
- Founder: Ramón Zapata Acosta
- Type: Cultural Organization
- Purpose: Fine Arts, Literature, Social Sciences, Physical Sciences
- Location: Ponce, Puerto Rico
- Coordinates: 18.01167°N 66.61444°W
- Region served: Southern Puerto Rico
- Members: 60+
- Employees: 0
- Volunteers: 60+
- Website: www.pucpr.edu/alianzas/ateneodeponce/

The Ateneo de Ponce (English: Ponce Atheneum) is a nonprofit, civic, non governmental organization located in Ponce, Puerto Rico, that seeks to preserve and promote Ponce's cultural traditions. The institution, founded on 15 September 1956, by Ramón Zapata Acosta, is one of Ponce's chief cultural institutions.

== Location ==
The Ponce Atheneum does not have a permanent physical brick-and-mortar location. It operates out of donated space at either the Pontifical Catholic University of Puerto Rico or the Museo de Arte de Ponce for its meetings and symposiums.

== History ==
The mission of the Ateneo de Ponce is to preserve and promote the culture of the sciences, literature and the arts. To achieve its mission, on 15 September 1956, the Atheneum was formed and memorialized via an inaugural ball. There were 111 co-founding partners led by Ramón Zapata, who was the president of the Atheneum during several terms. To achieve its objectives the Atheneum organizes a variety of activities such as dissertations, conferences, tournaments, publications, concerts, and various other presentations. Zapata Acosta is recognized at Ponce's Tricentennial Park for his contributions in the field of literature. It emerged as a result of the cultural resurgence in the city starting in the 1940s, and accelerated by the physical, demographic, industrial, commercial, and financial development that followed.

== Organization ==
The Atheneum is made up of five sections: social sciences, physical sciences and mathematics, history, literature, and fine arts. The administrative staff consists of the members of the Governing Board, which has nine members: president, vice president, secretary, treasurer, the presidents of the five sections. As of 2007, the Atheneum had 60 regular members in its roster.

Its current (November 2010) officers are:

- José R. Escabí – President
- Ada Hilda Martínez de Alicea – Vice President
- María Isabel Chaparro de Escabí – Secretary
- Lesbia Cruz – Treasurer
- Attorney Roberto García - President, Social Sciences section
- Arnaldo Carrasquillo Jiménez - President, Physical, Natural Sciences, and Mathematics section
- Iván Torres Hoyos - President, History section
- Estela García - President, Literature section
- Vidalina Rodríguez Carreras - President, Fine Arts section
- Carlos Zapata – Member
- Attorney Gilda Wilson - Member
- Antonio Sajid López - Member
- Migdalia González - Member
- Arnaldo Carrasquillo - Member
- José Raúl Cepeda - Member

== See also ==
- Ateneo Puertorriqueño
