= Avenida Alfonso Valdés Cobián =

Highway in Puerto Rico

Boulevard Alfonso Valdés Cobián (Alfonso Valdés Cobián Boulevard) is the main entrance to Mayagüez from the North. It corresponds with the former Post Street, north of the Yagüez River section.

The boulevard begins near the Vita Gate (main entrance) of the University of Puerto Rico at Mayagüez. It is part of a 5-way intersection that crosses Eugenio María de Hostos Avenue (PR-2) and Luis Lloréns Torres Avenue near the Escuela Vocacional Dr. Pedro Perea Fajardo (vocational high school).

Businesses and landmarks that lie on this street include: Mayagüez Town Center (a shopping center), the "Radamés Peña" store, some college student housing, the Cervecería India, the Casilla del Caminero and the old athletic field of the University of Puerto Rico at Mayagüez (UPRM). The street ends at UPRM's Barcelona Gate 5-way junction that includes the Pedro Albizu Campos Avenue and the Ramón Emeterio Betances Street.

It was named since 1997 after Alfonso Valdés Cobián, an industrialist, banker, sportsman and politician.

== See also ==
- List of highways in Puerto Rico
