= Miguel Angel García Méndez Post Office Building =

Historic building in Mayagüez, Puerto Rico

Coordinates: 18°12′05.60″N 67°08′38.09″W

- U.S. Post Office and Courthouse
- U.S. National Register of Historic Places
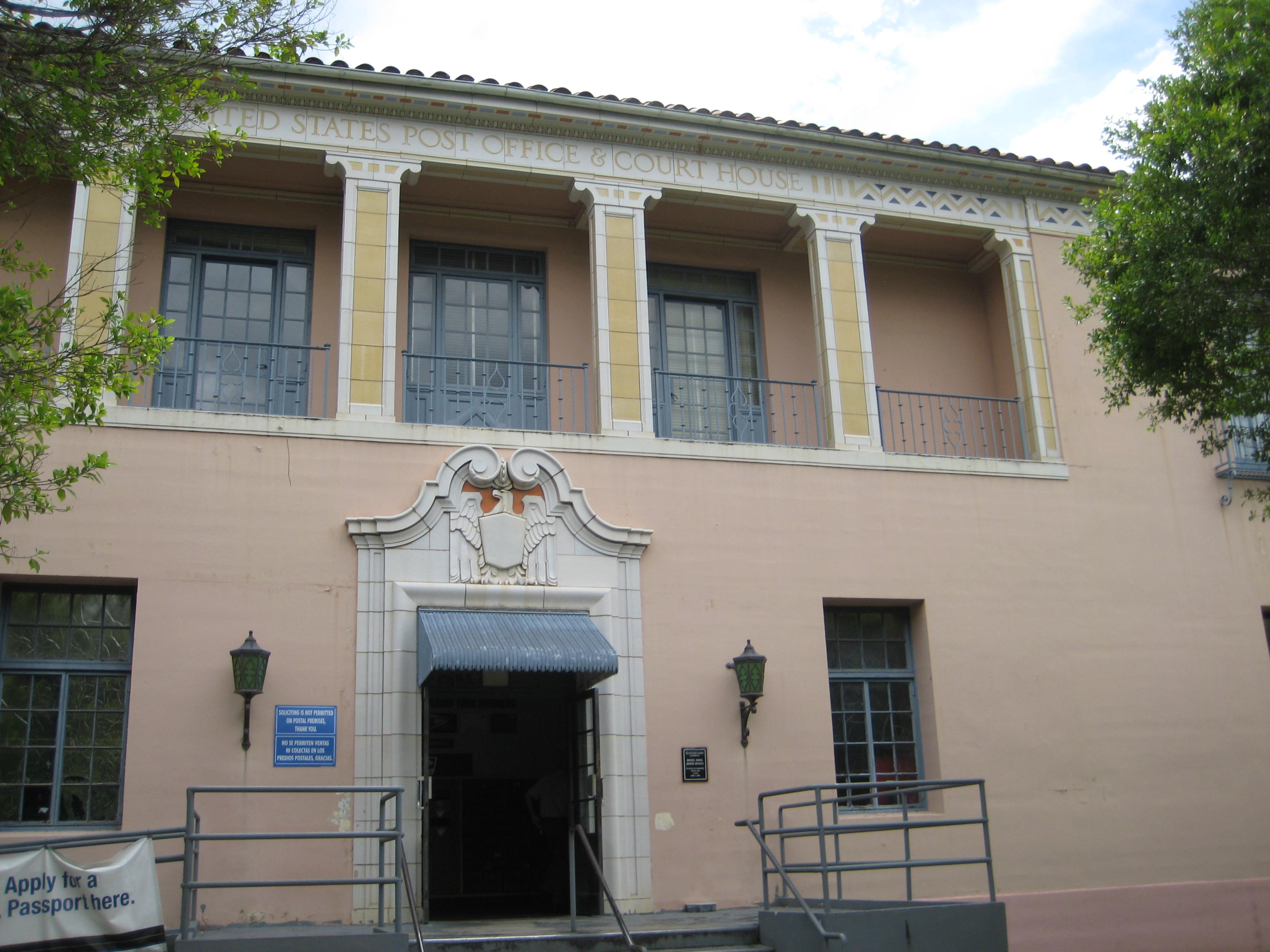

- Location within Puerto Rico
- Location: Candelaria (former McKinley) and Pilar Defillo Streets, Mayagüez, Puerto Rico
- Built: 1935
- Architect: Office of the Supervising Architect
- NRHP reference No.: 86001169
- Added to NRHP: May 21, 1986

The Miguel Angel Garcia Mendez Post Office Building in Mayagüez, Puerto Rico, previously known as the United States Post Office and Courthouse, and also known as Correo Central de Mayagüez is a post office and courthouse facility of the United States, housing operations of the United States District Court for the District of Puerto Rico. It was designed by Louis A. Simon, Supervising Architect of the Treasury, and was built in 1935. It was listed on the National Register of Historic Places in 1986 as U.S. Post Office and Courthouse. In 2007, the U.S. Congress passed a bill renaming the building for statesman and local government figure Miguel A. García Méndez.

== Overview ==
Built during Spanish rule, first the Barracks of the Alfonso XII Regiment until 1898, then the district court and jail until the October 11, 1918 earthquake when the old brick building was destroyed. The barracks were built in 1848; they were large and had two floors. They could house a battalion of 800 men and its officers. The building's brick roof had 30 lightning rods.

== Gallery ==
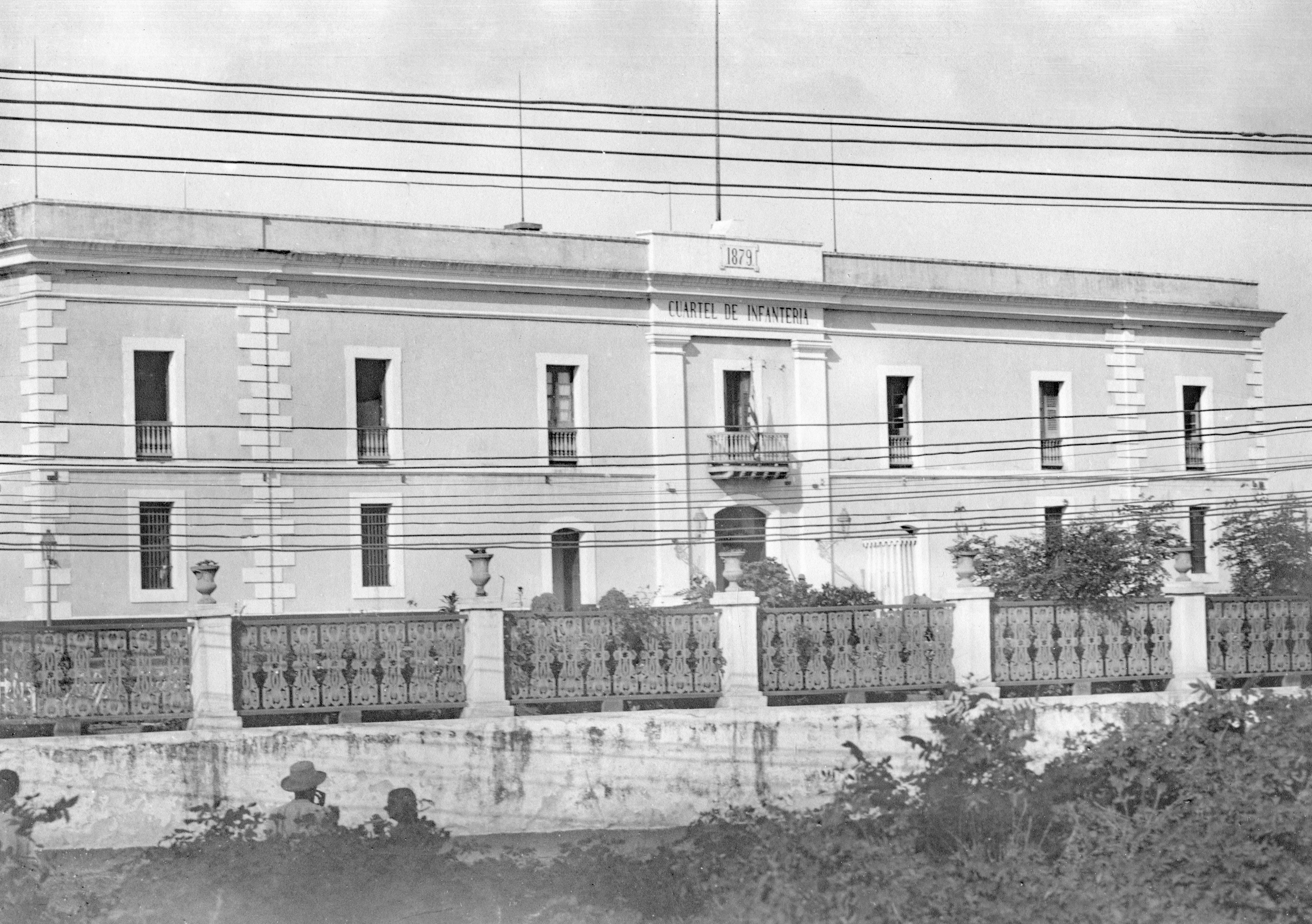
Infantry Barracks in 1898

Barracks, circa 1906

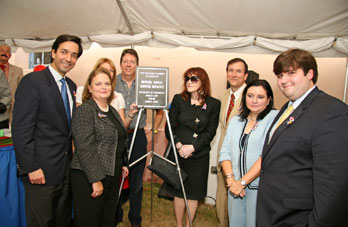
Official designation of the post office with Luis Fortuño and García Méndez family

== See also ==
- List of United States post offices
