= Imna Arroyo =

Puerto Rican painter

- Born: 1951; Guayama, Puerto Rico

Imna Arroyo is a Puerto Rican artist. Her work is centered on printmaking and painting, particularly around the theme of "energia de mujeres", or "women's energy".

== Early life and education ==
Arroyo was born in 1951 in Guayama, Puerto Rico and attended the Pontifical Catholic University of Puerto Rico as an honors student in 1966. She graduated in 1967 and enrolled at the Escuela de Artes Plásticas de Puerto Rico where she studied under Frank Cerbonie, Rafael Tufiño, Luis Hernández Cruz and Susana Herero. After the death of her mother in 1973, Arroyo moved to New York and studied at the Pratt Institute, graduating in 1977 with a B.F.A. and then studying at the printmaking department at Yale University's School of Art, where she was a student of Gabor Peterdi, Winefred Lutz, Greta Campbell, Elizabeth Murray and Samia Halaby.

== Career ==
Following her graduation from Yale, Arroyo moved to New York University where she worked in printmaking with Krishna Reddy. She was awarded a Ford Foundation Teaching Grant in the same year, and an Artist Project Grant by the Connecticut Commission on the Arts in 1980. In 1982 she began exploring the theme of "energia de mujeres", or "women's energy", inspired by her experience of women within her family and heritage; this continues to be her primary artistic theme. From 1996 to 1993, Arroyo served as Commissioner of the Commission of Cultural Affairs of New Haven, and was a Women in Leadership Honoree. In 1987, she was awarded the Merit Award of South Central Community College, and in 1994, the Professional Development Award of Eastern Connecticut State University, where she's currently a Professor of Art and chairs the Visual Arts Department.

In 1990 Arroyo completed her series Moving Through the Spiral, a collection of paintings and lithographs influenced by her visits to Mexico and New Mexico. Other prominent exhibitions and series include Time, Movement and Symbolism at the Akus Gallery and Charter Oak Cultural Center in 1995, and participation in a group exhibit at the 14th General Assembly and Congress of the UNESCO International Association of Art, also in 1995. In 2000 she created Voices of Water with Lillian Pitt, Gail Tremblay and Betsy Damon; this was then exhibited at the CESTA Festival. The same year, she collaborated with Arto Lindsay on Santuario para les animas Africanas (Sanctuary for the [Tortured] African Souls), which was exhibited in the ruins of the Iglesia Santo Domingo in Panama City. In 2011 Arroyo served as the Master Artist-in-Residence at Spelman College. In 2012 she was awarded the Outstanding Latino Cultural Award from the American Association of Hispanics in Higher Education.

Her most recent exhibition was "Ancestors of the Passage" at the University of Connecticut. The exhibition consisted of an installation "composed of 27 terracotta ceramic figures, each extending their hands out to the audience from a sea of acrylic canvases and silk fabric. According to the artist, these figures represent the African ancestors who died in the Middle Passage, where millions of people were forcibly transported across the Atlantic Ocean to the New World." "The figures are surrounded by 47 black and white collagraphs which feature two-dimensional images similar to the sculptures and a projected video titled “Trail of Bones.” Finally, there is an altar to pay tribute to the ancestors and allow audience members to write on small prints to their ancestors.Through the variety of media, Arroyo works not to simply condemn historical oppressors, but to express her own identity and honor those who made her life possible through their struggles."

"Arroyo called her work “timely” because of how it intertwined historical, political, social, environmental and even personal issues into one conversation. She mentions how climate change is impacting sea levels and then she connects it to Puerto Rico, where people have been living for months with inadequate resources including a lack of potable water. She took these broad issues and used them in her work to discuss deeper issues.

“It’s concerned about not only what’s happening with the environment, but also the displacement of people from their places, refugees. We might not want to acknowledge that we have refugees dealing with climate change and that’s one of our realities of our time,” Arroyo said.

Arroyo also stressed the importance of exchange in her work. Through the physical set-up of the piece and the interaction altar, she emphasizes the importance of the exchange and of conversation. However, firsthand experience is crucial to conveying this authentically."

== Personal life ==
While living in Puerto Rico, Arroyo married Tito Efrain Mattei and had two daughters, Isis and Swahili. She left her husband before moving to the United States, but later remarried him and they had a third child, a son.

== Bibliography ==
- Chiarmonte, Paula (1990). Women Artists in the United States. G. K. Hall & Co. ISBN 081618917X.
- Meskimmon, Marsha; Davies, Martin L. (2003). Breaking the Disciplines: Reconceptions in Culture, Knowledge and Art. I.B.Tauris. ISBN 0857710990.
- Ressler, Susan R. (2003). Women Artists of the American West. McFarland. ISBN 078641054X.
