= Calle José de Diego (Mayagüez) =

Major road in Puerto Rico

Calle José de Diego (José de Diego Street) is a major thoroughfare in the western Puerto Rico municipality of Mayagüez. The street is oriented east–west with traffic running two-way drive with two lanes into downtown Mayagüez.

The street begins at Parque José de Diego and finish in dead-end aside PR-2 Highway. Is parallel with Méndez Vigo Street.

Alongside are located side entrances to the Hospital San Antonio and Hospital Perea, and some pubs.

== History of the name ==
The street is named after José de Diego. Originally named Calle de la Rosa.
