= Pontifical Catholic University of Puerto Rico at Mayagüez =

Private university in Puerto Rico

- Pontificia Universidad Católica de Puerto Rico Recinto de Mayagüez
- Type: Pontifical university
- Established: 1962; 64 years ago
- Chancellor: Olga N. Hernandez
- President: Jorge I. Velez Arocho
- Academic staff: 100
- Students: 1600
- Location: Mayagüez, Puerto Rico; 18°10′53.63″N 67°8′43.14″W
- Campus: Urban
- Mascot: Pionero
- Website: www.pucpr.edu/mayaguez

The Pontifical Catholic University of Puerto Rico at Mayagüez is a private, Roman Catholic university in Mayagüez, Puerto Rico. It is part of the Pontifical Catholic University of Puerto Rico.

The university began as an extension of the Catholic University of Puerto Rico in the early 1960s. In 1982 it was awarded the official title of "Center", and later it became the Mayagüez Campus of the Pontifical Catholic University of Puerto Rico at Mayagüez in 1996. During the 1989–1990 academic year the facilities in the Calle Ramón Emeterio Betances were inaugurated.

The campus includes four buildings (Monseñor Ulises Casiano, Centro de Estudiantes, Centro Tecnológico and EUTHAC). The enrollment is above one thousand fivehundred students and the faculty part-time and full-time is composed of about one hundred professors.

Its academic offers include non-university technical certificates in various concentrations. As well as its academic university programs in Associates and bachelor's degrees from its four colleges (Education, Science, Business Administration, Arts and Humanities). Master's degrees can be found in three academic areas: Business Administration (4 concentrations), Education (3 concentrations) and Social Sciences.
