= Pontifical Catholic University of Puerto Rico =

Private university in Ponce, Puerto Rico

- Pontificia Universidad Católica de Puerto Rico
- Type: Private university
- Established: 1948; 78 years ago
- Religious affiliation: Roman Catholic
- Chancellor: Ruben Gonzalez Medina
- President: José A. Frontera Agenjo LL.M.
- Students: 12,000
- Location: Ponce, Puerto Rico; 18°0′8.81″N 66°37′2.34″W
- Website: www.pucpr.edu

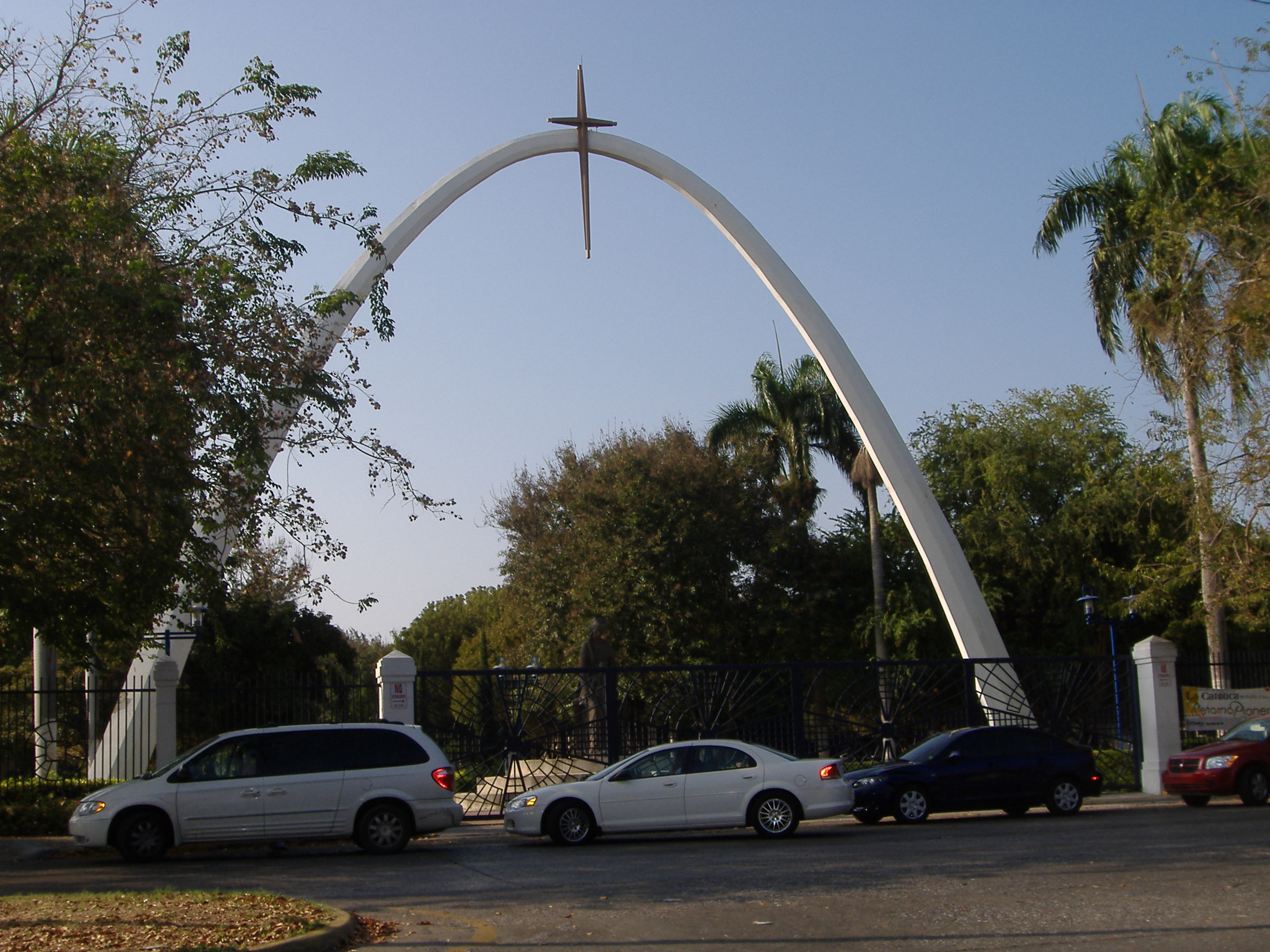
Front entrance of the university

The Pontifical Catholic University of Puerto Rico (Spanish: Pontificia Universidad Católica de Puerto Rico) is a private Catholic university with its main campus in Ponce, Puerto Rico. It provides courses leading to bachelor's, master's and doctorate degrees in education, business administration, the sciences, and arts and humanities. It also has campuses in Arecibo and Mayagüez, as well as a satellite extension in Coamo. It is also home to a School of Law and a School of Architecture. The university also founded a medical school, the Escuela de Medicina de Ponce, in 1977, but in 1980 it became an independent entity that eventually became the Ponce Health Sciences University.

The Pontifical Catholic University of Puerto Rico was founded in 1948 as Universidad Católica de Santa María, but its name was changed to Universidad Católica de Puerto Rico with the graduation of its first class in 1950. On 25 January 1991, the name was changed again to its current name, after Pope John Paul II bestowed the title of pontifical on the university.

== History ==
The university was founded in spring of 1948 by James E. McManus, C.S.S.R., Bishop of the Diocese of Ponce, and James Peter Davis, Bishop of the Diocese of San Juan. It was founded as the Catholic University of Santa María. "The name Santa María was chosen to honor the Mother of God and to implore her protection and help." Its first president was Monseñor Vicente Murga. The original campus consisted of a few classrooms provided by the Capuchin Friars (OFM) and the Sisters of Saint Joseph, catholic clergymen and nuns, respectively, in the Colegio San Conrado in Ponce, a catholic primary educational school. During 1949, the university acquired 118 cuerdas (115 acres) from the Government of Puerto Rico (administered by Autoridad de Tierras). This plot of land was located south of the city center proper and was, at the time, part of the Ingenio La Reparada sugar cane plantation, and being used to feed Central Mercedita sugar mill. The University has been accredited by the Middle States Association of Colleges and Schools since 1953.

=== Presidents ===
1. Vicente Murga (1948 - 1953)
2. William Ferree (1953 - 1956)
3. Thomas Stanley (1956 - 1961)
4. John F. Mueller (1961 - 1965)
5. Theodore McCarrick (1965 - 1969)
6. Francisco Carreras (1969 - 1981)
7. Jaime B. Fuster (1981 - 1984)
8. Tossello Giangiacono (1984 - 2001)
9. Jose Alberto Morales (2001 - 2006)
10. Marcelina Velez de Santiago (2006 - 2010)
11. Jorge Iván Vélez Arocho (2010–2024)
12. José A. Frontera Agenjo

== Schools ==
In 1961, the university started the School of Law providing graduate law studies and student exchange programs with other law schools in the United States and in Spain. The school has been host to famous and respected Puerto Rican law professors, including former Puerto Rico governor Rafael Hernández Colón.

In 1976, the university started the School of Medicine as a graduate medical education program, which, when reorganized, became an independent private institution now known as the Ponce Health Sciences University.

In 2009, the university opened a School of Architecture.

In 2011, the university announced it was engaging in a $20 million expansion plan that would result in the creation of three new schools over a ten-year period. The three new schools were reported to be a School of Graphical Design, a School of Fashion, and a School of Cinematic Arts.

== Campuses ==
Aside from its main campus in Ponce, specifically on barrio Canas Urbano, on Avenida Las Americas (PR-163), the university has two additional campuses: the Pontifical Catholic University of Puerto Rico at Arecibo in Arecibo and the Pontifical Catholic University of Puerto Rico at Mayagüez in Mayagüez. It also has a satellite extension in Coamo. The Pontifical Catholic University of Puerto Rico School of Architecture is also a separate campus and is located across from Plaza Las Delicias at the historic Forteza Building in downtown Ponce. In 2025 Bayamón Central University merged with PUCPR, thus establishing a third campus in Bayamon.

== Student life ==
Fraternities

- Phi Eta Mu
- Phi Sigma Alpha
- Nu Sigma Beta
- Alpha Beta Chi
- Phi Alpha Delta
- Phi Delta Gamma
- Alpha Omicron Sigma
- Sigma Lambda Beta
- Alpha Phi Omega

Sororities

- Lambda Theta Alpha
- Mu Alpha Phi
- Eta Gamma Delta

== Notable alumni ==
- Imna Arroyo
- Javier Culson
- Juan H. Cintrón García
- Juan Miguel Betancourt
- Julio Brady
- Lymari Nadal
- Rafael Cordero Santiago
- Luisa R. Seijo Maldonado
- Wichie Torres
- Rafael Cartagena Ródriguez

== See also ==
- Museo de Arqueología de la Pontificia Universidad Católica de Puerto Rico
- Pontifical Catholic University of Puerto Rico School of Law
- Ponce School of Medicine
- Pontifical Catholic University of Puerto Rico at Mayagüez
- Pontifical Catholic University of Puerto Rico School of Architecture
- Coro de la Pontificia Universidad Católica de Puerto Rico
