= Calle Méndez Vigo (Mayagüez) =

Major thoroughfare in Puerto Rico

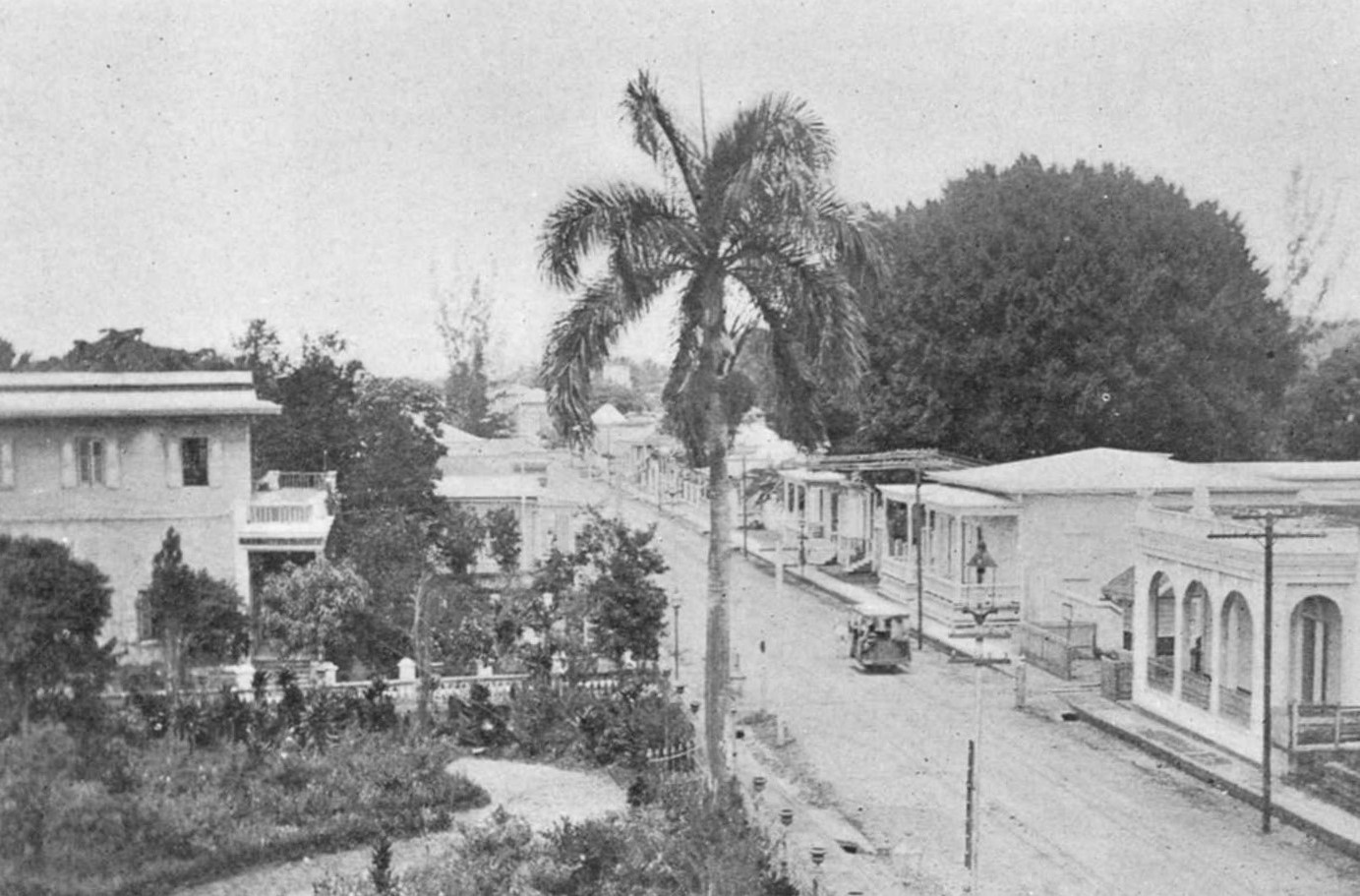
Lower End of the Calle de Mendez-Vigo (c. 1907)

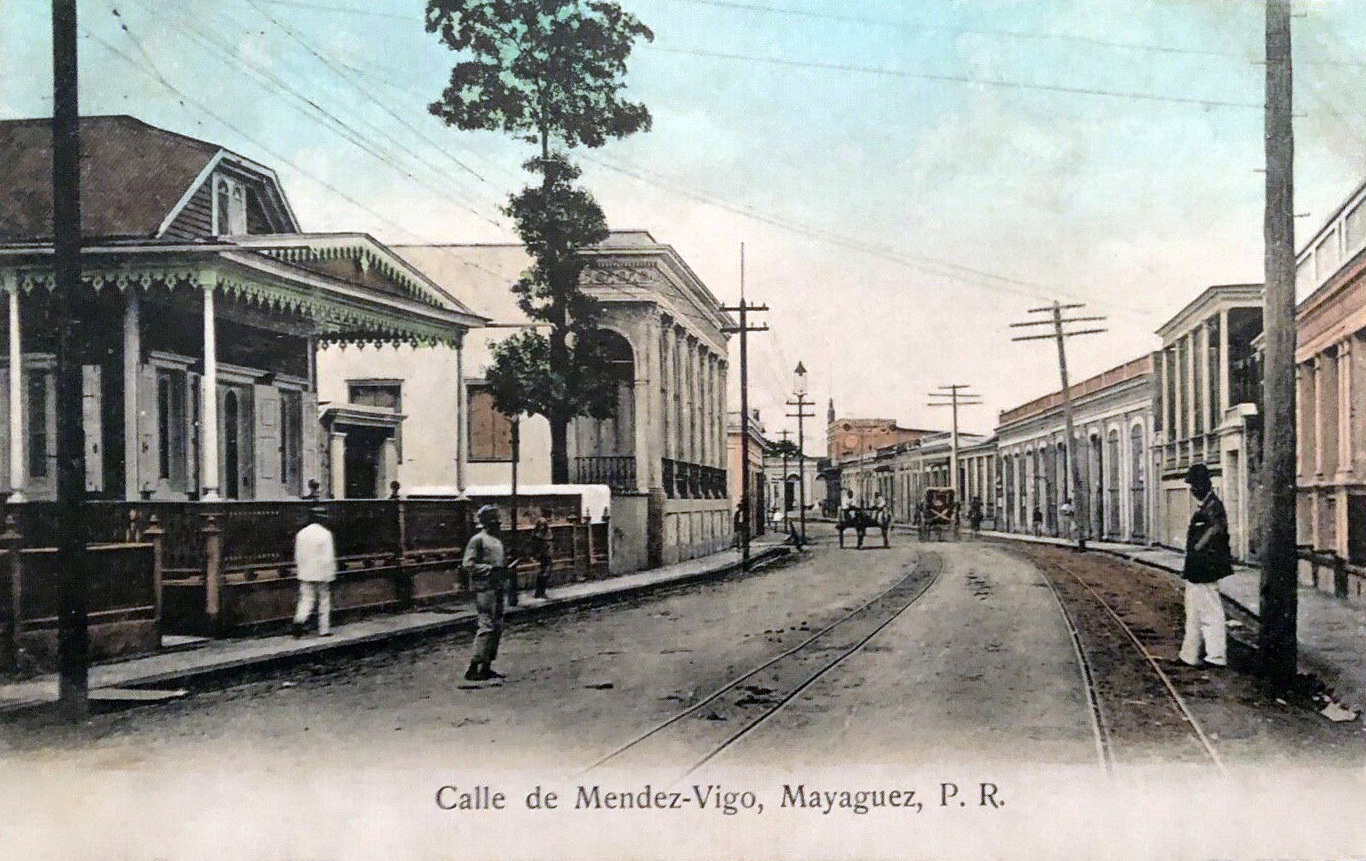
Calle Mendez Vigo, circa 1910

Calle Méndez Vigo (Mendez Vigo Street) is a major thoroughfare in the western Puerto Rico municipality of Mayagüez with a length of about 1.22 miles (2 km). The street is oriented east–west with traffic running one-way westbound with the number of lanes going from one to two after the road passes Calle Ramón Emeterio Betances (formerly Post Street) in downtown Mayagüez. Some of the most important historical places in Mayagüez are located on this street:

- E. Franco & Co (the house of the "Brazo Gitano Franco")
- Escuela Mariano Riera Palmer
- Iglesia Católica de Nuestra Señora del Carmen
- Edificio Darlington
- Parque Suau, Casa Gómez
- Antiguo Hospital Ramírez
- Casa Casals-Defilló
- Edificio Westernbank
- Iglesia Central Presbiteriana
- Edificio la Palma
- Edificio La Bolsa
- Panadería y Repostería Ricomini
- Municipal Historical Archives (Teatro Riera)
- Teatro Balboa

== History of the name ==
The street is named after Spanish General Santiago de Méndez Vigo, who was Governor of Puerto Rico during the early 1840s. The Great Fire of 1841 on January 30 destroyed much of the Villa; of the 700 houses in Mayagüez, only 40 remained. Governor Santiago Méndez Vigo was informed and he immediately headed towards Mayagüez on horseback with a few of his assistants. The governor brings with him 20,000 pesos in silver coins to help the victims of the fire. The Villa of Mayagüez in a gratefulness to the Governor changes the name of the main street to Méndez Vigo. Before the street was called Calle Comercio (Commerce Street).

== See also ==
- List of highways in Puerto Rico
