= Radio Colegial =

Student-run radio station at the University of Puerto Rico–Mayagüez

Radio Colegial is a student run radio station of the University of Puerto Rico - Mayaguez campus. On it, participants have to create radio programs every semester which can be educational, informative or just to entertain the radio listeners. By creating these programs, students have the opportunity to develop creativity, social and communication skills which will help them in the future.

== History ==
In 2007 a group of students from the Institute of Electrical and Electronics Engineers (IEEE), Recinto Universitario de Mayaguez (RUM) Chapter, took on the task to take a project from their organization that consisted of only one radio program and transformed it into a project that not only was for their benefit, but to whole student community. It was so how Radio Colegial was born, the official Radio Station of students from RUM, created and managed by students.

== Overview ==
This radio station broadcast its programming through the portal www.radiocolegial.com or uprm.edu/radiocolegial. This project has been with collaboration from the start and worked in conjunction with the General Student Body, the Campus Administration and the Association of University Students Radio Colegial, which is composed by students from different departments and faculties. The mission is the creation of a communication media for the student community through Internet Radio.

Radio Colegial has reached practically all the regions from the world and over passing the 7,000 listeners, basically doubling the audience with each year.

..."Students from marketing, engineering, agronomy and other disciplines joined forces to create an alternative to radio across the internet, focused on the university community"...

== Programming ==
The programming is done to connect and get in touch with all that happens in the “Collegial” student life. Attending the necessities of this market is pretty simple because all of the people who work on this project are students and they share the same necessities.

Some of the broadcast contains all the cultural and athletics activities of the Campus. As part of the programming in the athletics area, Radio Colegial broadcast the volleyball and basketball games held in the campus, most of the times serving as the only communication media to transmit the games, even when the Feminine Varsity Basketball Championship won the gold in 2009. In the coverage of other activities Radio Colegial has distinguished itself in important events of the University such as the lightning of Christmas Night, The Agricultural Fair-Five Days with Our Earth, among others. Radio Colegial also takes part in educational development for the community such as conferences and educational forums where professionals and entrepreneurs have visited the station. Moreover, as part of the mission to support and promote the local music and talent, RC only plays independent music as their musical programming.

== Goals ==
Radio Colegial as it continues to grow, plans on keep helping and contributing to the student community. Some of their goals are:

- Continue serving as communication and expression media for the students in the RUM campus
- Encourage among students the development of new ideas that permit the growth of Radio Colegial and the community
- To keep being a Communications media that understands and Works with the necessities of the students and to continue being managed by them

== See also ==
- WPUC-FM: Pontifical Catholic University of Puerto Rico
- WRTU: University of Puerto Rico-San Juan
