= University of Puerto Rico strikes =

University of Puerto Rico strikes may refer to:

- University of Puerto Rico strikes, 2010–11, University of Puerto Rico student strikes of 2010 and 2011
- University of Puerto Rico strikes, 2017, University of Puerto Rico student strikes of 2017

== See also ==
- University of Puerto Rico
