= Luis Stefani =

Puerto Rican university chancellor

Luis Stéfani Raffucci was a long time Chancellor of the University of Puerto Rico at Mayagüez.

He was born in Mayagüez, Puerto Rico. His father was a Corsican immigrant.

Stéfani studied engineering at the Massachusetts Institute of Technology. He was a member of the Phi Sigma Alpha fraternity.

The faculties of Agriculture, Engineering and Science were created under his direction.

== Legacy ==
The General Engineering building at the University of Puerto Rico at Mayagüez bears his name. The most important award that the University of Puerto Rico at Mayagüez gives to any graduate is the Luis Stéfani Award. A street in the Hostos neighborhood in Mayagüez is named in his honor.

== See also ==
- University of Puerto Rico at Mayaguez people
