= Hotel Colegial =

Student accommodation and hotel building at the University of Puerto Rico at Mayagüez

- Interactive map of the Hotel Colegial area
- Alternative names: Edificio A (English: "Building A"); Residencia de Atletas (English: "Athletes' Residence")

General information
- Location: Ave. Las Marías, University of Puerto Rico at Mayagüez
- Coordinates: 18.21789°N 67.14474°W
- Completed: 1978

Technical details
- Floor count: 8
- Floor area: 42,130 ft^{2} (3,914 m^{2})

Website
- Official website (Archived)

The Hotel Colegial ("College Hotel", in English), also known as Building A and the Athletes' Residence, is a student accommodation building which currently serves as the only on-campus dormitory in the University of Puerto Rico at Mayagüez (UPRM).

Located in the northwestern part of the campus, on Las Marías avenue, the eight-story structure was built in 1978, with a present capacity of at least 80 (1995), 84 units (2001) and 90 athletes (2014).

== Facilities ==
It was originally designed as student dormitory rooms, was then converted into a hotel/hostel providing temporary housing for visiting faculty and UPRM affiliates. It currently serves mostly student athletes and continues to provide temporary hostel services. As of 2014, the Hotel's fifth, sixth and seventh floors lodge high performance athletes during the whole year at no cost, while the third and fourth floors are rented out to external guests, as well as offering six air-conditioned rooms with en-suite bathrooms.

Apart from being the only university-owned student housing at the Mayagüez campus, it is also one of only three in the whole University of Puerto Rico system. It is administered by the University Enterprises office, which falls under the Dean of Administration. It is serviced by the UPRM's trolley service by being a stop on its Route 4 or "Terrace" route. A stay at the Hotel used to start at $16.35, as of 2001, however, prices now range between $32, for a double room with a shared bathroom, to $63, for a triple room with private bathroom and air conditioning, a night. In a 2007 national hotel survey, the Hotel reported it had 35 rooms.

The Hotel serves as lodging for UPRM events attendees, such as the CAAMpAbilities week-long event, where low-income blind children are exposed to a variety of physical activities, the high school students summer program, the National Colloquium on Women, and the Inter-American Congress of Philosophy and Technology. The UPRM Agricultural Extension Service's induction program for new professors used to be carried out in the Hotel, as it had the benefit of lodging the incoming personnel for the week long program. Other events hosted include the Partnership for Spatial and Computational Research (PaSCoR) summer camp for university students, the founding of the CoHemis program, and luminaries such as Dr. Yusufu Jande. The Hotel has been planned to be used as lodging for Spanish students participating in the OLÉ – RUM España student exchange program.

The Hotel's personnel who are directly in charge of handling used bedding and cleaning the rooms, as well as the person in charge of the laundry, are identified in the UPRM's Exposure Control Plan to Bloodborne Pathogens as at-risk exposure employees.

== History ==
The Hotel Colegial was damaged by Hurricane Georges in 1998, however, it was later rehabilitated.

Around 2001 it offered a student-services exchange program, whereby the participating students would work on extended schedules in exchange for free room and board.

An audit by the Puerto Rico Comptroller found that the UPRM did not report the findings of an internal audit comprising the period from 1985 till 1992, that at least $6,459 was illegally appropriated by a Hotel Colegial auxiliary collector. The event was detected by Hotel personnel and informed to the UPRM Administration Dean. The employee paid back $4,027 and resigned in 1989.

In 2006, the last student tenants of the neighboring Darlington building were removed and placed in the Hotel.

In the 2011–2012 fiscal year, the UPRM increased the level of security in the Hotel and designated several students to be in charge of the "order and proper functioning of the [Hotel]." A cycling infrastructure study carried out in 2012, identified the constant placing of bicycles in front of, where students were placing more than fifteen bikes, and recommended that the area be affixed with labeling, a gravel base and a bike rack fixed to the floor.

During the 2014–2015 fiscal year, the Hotel managed the eviction of the rooms used as archives on the fourth floor by the Financial Aid, Student Dean and Finance offices, enabling to rent the rooms out as part of the Hotel. In addition, an industrial washing machine was acquired to increase the laundry capacity in the building. It made an overall revenue of $30,328.10 during the period.

The Hotel was involved indirectly in an alleged money mismanagement scandal, when the UPRM paid for rooms at the neighboring privately owned Mayagüez Resort & Casino during the 2016 Justas. The then-rector, John Fernández Van Cleve, recognized that $6,467.30 was paid for four rooms at the resort, as even though the UPRM had $30 thousand in savings by lodging athletes and trainers in the Hotel Colegial, not all fit there and the Resort was chosen since it had been the only lodging with vacancy during the sporting events.

Due in part to the University of Puerto Rico strikes during 2017, the Hotel allegedly lost $25,267.00 in rent for the 2016–2017 fiscal year. However, they did make $25,830.00 in revenue during the same time period, in which they were able to complete the removal of asbestos in athlete-occupied rooms. During the 2018–2019 fiscal year, the Hotel made $29,170.00 in revenue, however it lost a potential $3,645.00 in sales by giving partial or full discounts to certain activities upon orders of the then-rector, Wilma Santiago Gabrielini. During a customer satisfaction survey carried until 2019, the UPRM found that the two major complaints were the need for bathroom repairs and heated water.

In August 2018, a report on the Hotel Colegial was submitted to and a meeting held with Santiago Gabrilini, with a committee being named for that purpose that was expected to start holding meetings during the January to May 2019 semester. In September 2019, the rector, Augstín Rullán Toro, held a meeting on the rehabilitation of the first three floors of the building.

After the 2019–20 Puerto Rico earthquakes, the structure was visually inspected on 12 January 2020. The inspectors recommended that even though no structure damage could be seen, the fissures found should be repaired, as well as referring the possibility of asbestos in the building to the UPRM health and security office.

As part of the CARES Act's Higher Education Emergency Relief Fund, the UPRM received $4.5 million to remodel three floors and enlarge the offering to high-need students. The UPRM considers this to be "temporary housing." The alterations will include replacing the electrical and plumbing systems, as well as the furniture. In addition, the bathrooms, bedrooms and common areas will be rehabilitated as well. As of February 2021, the project had already been ratified, with a building permit and complete building plans.
