= Yomaira Pagán Torres =

Puerto Rican chemical engineer

- Born: Puerto Rico, U.S.
- Education: University of Puerto Rico at Mayagüez (B.S.); University of Wisconsin–Madison (Ph.D.)
- Scientific career
- Fields: Chemical engineering, materials science
- Workplaces: Dow Chemical Company; University of Puerto Rico at Mayagüez
- Thesis: Catalytic strategies and catalyst design for the conversion of biomass-derived carbohydrates to chemicals (2011)
- Doctoral advisor: James Dumesic

Yomaira Jeannette Pagán Torres is a Puerto Rican chemical engineer. She is a professor in the department of chemical engineer at University of Puerto Rico at Mayagüez. Pagán was formerly a senior engineer at the Dow Chemical Company.

== Early life and education ==
Pagán was born and raised in Puerto Rico. She completed a B.S. in chemical engineering at University of Puerto Rico at Mayagüez and a Ph.D. in chemical engineering at University of Wisconsin–Madison. Her 2011 dissertation was titled Catalytic strategies and catalyst design for the conversion of biomass-derived carbohydrates to chemicals. Pagán's doctoral advisor was James Dumesic.

== Career ==
Pagán worked for the Dow Chemical Company as a senior engineer in the feed stocks, olefins, chemicals, and alternative technologies research and development group in Freeport, Texas. She later joined the department of chemical engineering at University of Puerto Rico at Mayagüez (UPRM) as an assistant professor.

=== Research ===
Pagán researches "the design and synthesis of novel heterogeneous catalytic materials with tailored active sites for the transformation of carbon resources, such as biomass, carbon dioxide, and methane to chemicals and fuels." At UPRM, her research group investigates "elucidating reaction mechanisms, conducting kinetic studies, and in the synthesis of novel nano-structured catalyst for the selective transformation of carbon based resources."
