= Tarzán (mascot) =

Official mascot of the University of Puerto Rico at Mayagüez

- University: University of Puerto Rico, Mayagüez Campus
- Conference: L.A.I.
- Description: English bulldog
- Origin of name: Johnny Weissmüller as Tarzan
- First seen: 1950
- Related mascot(s): Jane

Tarzán is the official mascot of the University of Puerto Rico at Mayagüez, also known as "Colegio".

== History ==
In 1946 the "Colegio" was one of the most successful universities in sports in Puerto Rico. By that time Johnny Weissmüller had made the character of Tarzan very popular, his character incarnated masculinity, courage and athleticism and for that reason, up until 1946 the university would dress a student up as the loincloth Tarzan to cheer on the Mayagüez student-athletes. In later years a lion and even a puma were considered for school mascots, but those were ruled out because of the laws would not be allowed to be paraded.

Towards mid-1940s with the Second World War coming to an end, and among the many people that for one reason or another had grabbed the attention of the world press was Winston Churchill. Because of his heroism the people started calling him the "English Bulldog". Three men; Sixto Ramírez, Libertario Avilés and Héctor Huyke decided that by analogy the mascot named Tarzán would be a Bulldog. The university administration made the relevant efforts to obtain the bulldog which would be baptized Tarzan, however, these efforts were unsuccessful and instead had to parade the boxer belonging to the ROTC Colonel Victor Domenech. This became the first "Colegio" team mascot.

When the first bulldog or Tarzán I arrived in 1950 the university received him with an ROTC and Marching band parade with the attendance of the entire university. He was tended to in a particular manner; a cage was prepared under a mango tree and the freshmen students had to venerate the dog. A year later Tarzán I died of asphyxiation, victim of a bone he swallowed. Immediately after the demise of the first Tarzan, the students began a collection to replace the unfortunate original. So that Tarzán II would receive better care, he was placed under the custody of don Enrique Huyke, his meritorious work continued until 1975, year when the professor retired.

This second Tarzán came to the campus from Oklahoma when he had only eight weeks of life. The third and fourth stemmed from the kindness of Mr John Wiburn and his wife of Texas. The fifth and sixth Tarzans were a gift from one of the Social Fraternities on campus.

== Tarzán X ==
The mascot, Tarzán X, arrived December 2003 from a family of champion dogs raised in the State of Texas. The twin daughters of Díaz Piferrer, Margarita and Milagros, have the task of taking care of the canine. According to Diaz Piferrer, he even sleeps in their room with air conditioning. The dog was donated by the Alumni Association presided by Dr. Fred Soltero Harrington. Tarzán was baptized in a mass celebrated by Father Edwin Lugo; the religious act was celebrated on January 3, 2003, in the Student Center Building. Tarzán X died on July 9, 2011, of a heart attack. Tarzán XI died on October 14, 2020. The new Tarzán XII was introduced on October 21, 2020, at UPRM. He was born on June 27, 2020. He was donated by Dr. Michael Cabán for the Asociación y Fundación Alumni Colegial, presided by Yamileth Valentín Centeno.

== Tarzán sculpture ==
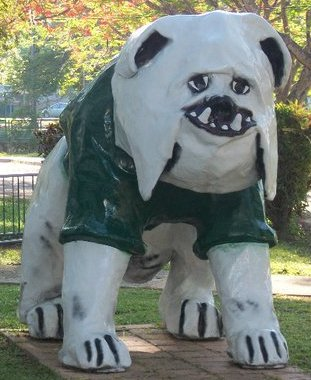
Tarzán Sculpture

The paper mache sculpture was created in 1967 a year after the Mayagüez Campus gained it administrative autonomy from the University of Puerto Rico. Tarzan II died and there was no mascot for the "Justas" or Inter University Games. Thus about 15 art students and athletes began to work on the sculpture. They decided to make a dog with chicken wire and cover it with Papier-mâché and starch because they didn't get the money to buy paste; they also used cardboard to give more strength in some areas, among the students who helped was Antulio "Kobbo" Santarrosa.

The result was a huge sculpture with more than ten feet in height and eighty pounds in weight, it was painted in the traditional white and green Colegio color. The sculpture made its début in April 1967 when it entered the Hiram Bithorn Stadium in front of the Mayagüez delegation to the Justas. Yet the statue was mocked by the rival universities fans because it lacked an important part of its male anatomy. Still the university won that year and as soon as the games were over, the students started the task of adding that part of the anatomy to the dog, but in a very pronounced manner. The next year 1968, when the sculpture Tarzán entered the stadium none of the rival students yelled at the dog because nobody could doubt its masculinity.

The dog has gone through various restorations; the first was in the seventies when the students decided to cover it with fiberglass for durability. This first restoration resulted in an increase in weight, now weighing 150 pounds. The Process also resulted in the bulldog having a more friendly facial expression. In 1985 it went through another restoration, and yet another one in the nineties when its paint got a touch-up. Other fixes included the installation of wire nets in the nose because in two occasions beehives made the orifices home.

Presently the sculpture rarely leaves the campus and in recent past years was usually located in front of the Student Center, nevertheless, on special occasions, the Paper Tarzán is dressed in gala. As is the case of the graduation when he is dressed in academic regalia wearing an Academic cap and Medals as if he were another graduate and is placed in front of the Rafael A. Mangual Coliseum where the graduation takes place. As soon as the students are declared graduates they head out to take a picture with the Paper Tarzán.

== Jane ==
In 1976 don Luis a. Vilanova donated the first female bulldog baptized with the name of Jane. Most of the "Janes" have perished because of cardiac complications. The last dog to bear the name Jane VIII, the partner of Tarzán X died in 2008 giving birth.
