= WRTU =

Public radio station at the Universidad de Puerto Rico in San Juan

- San Juan, Puerto Rico; Puerto Rico
- Broadcast area: Puerto Rico
- Frequency: 89.7 MHz
- Branding: Radio Universidad de Puerto Rico

Programming
- Format: Variety
- Affiliations: NPR; Public Radio Exchange; Radio Nederland; Radio France Internationale; BBC

Ownership
- Owner: University of Puerto Rico; (Universidad de Puerto Rico, Inc.)

History
- First air date: February 8, 1980; 46 years ago
- Call sign meaning: Radio Torre Universitaria

Technical information
- Licensing authority: FCC
- Facility ID: 69090
- Class: B
- ERP: 50,000 watts
- HAAT: 857.0 meters (2,811.7 ft)
- Transmitter coordinates: 18°15′52.8″N 66°55′53.5″W
- Repeater: 88.3 WRUO (Mayagüez, Puerto Rico)

Links
- Public license information: Public file; LMS
- Webcast: Listen Live PLS
- Website: wrtu.pr

WRTU (89.7 FM), branded on-air as Radio Universidad de Puerto Rico, is a NPR member station broadcasting a variety format, together with programming from NPR, PRX, the BBC and other distributors. Licensed to San Juan, Puerto Rico, the station is owned by the University of Puerto Rico.

WRTU's programming can also be heard in Mayagüez on WRUO 88.3 FM.

== See also ==
- Radio Colegial: University of Puerto Rico-Mayaguez
- WPUC-FM: Pontifical Catholic University of Puerto Rico
