= 2009–2010 California college tuition hike protests =

- Date: September 24, 2009 – March 4, 2010 (5 months, 1 week and 2 days)
- Location: California, United States

Police response
- Arrested: <700

The 2009–2010 California university college tuition hike protests were a series of protests held on college campuses in the University of California system and elsewhere in California in September 2009 through March 2010. The size of the protests at each campus varied with over 4,000 people at UC Berkeley and 20 at UC Merced. Protests were mostly made up of students, although faculty, school employees and others joined in the protests as well. Protestors were vocal against a tuition increase, pay cuts and other cutbacks following a budget deficit. The protests have been described as a precursor to the Occupy movement.

== Background ==
In 2003 Regent Blum, Regent Wachter and Regent Parsky consolidated control of UC's investment strategy, bypassing the university treasurer's in-house investment specialists, and hired private managers to handle a number of transactions. This action increased management costs and limited transparency, since these external managers were not subject to public record laws.

The amount of university money placed in private equity soon more than tripled, and by March 2009, the university's books carried a balance of $6.7 billion in 212 private equity partnerships, which consist primarily of risky leveraged buyout funds (LBOs)—more than 10 percent of the university investment fund total of $63 billion—and by spring of that year UC's private equity returns were running at a negative 20 percent. Likewise, after the financiers took control of the investment committee, the university's allocation to private real-estate deals increased from nearly zero to $4.5 billion in less than a decade, and by mid-2009, the private real-estate portfolio had lost an astonishing 40 percent of its value. This shift in investment strategy, which drained the university's endowment, had clear benefits for individuals on the board of regents.

By 2009, in a trend found across the nation to address budget shortfalls the State of California reduced its support to UC by $800 million, this along with the reduced returns on UC's investment portfolio the Board of Regents passed a tuition hike for, increasing tuition by 32%. UC President and Regent Mark G. Yudof's response to the tuition increase was "When you have no money, you have no money," and Dr. Harry Powell, staff advisor to the Regents, said, “The legislators have told us, essentially, ‘The student is your A.T.M. They’re how you should balance the budget.’”.

University officials stated that the tuition increases were needed as they had already done all they could. In the protests, students would point out that the state still seemed have quite a bit of money, with signs that read "California No. 1 in Prison Spending, yet #48 in Education."

The tuition hike was voted into effect by the regents on November 20, 2009, and was a two-step increase with the first hike set to go into effect at the beginning of 2010, and the second going into effect in the fall semester of 2010. When the Regents voted to pass the tuition hike on November 18, 2009, many students as well as professors and university faculty broke out in protests. The protests have been compared to similar protests which occurred in the 1960s at California universities.

== Protests ==
Demonstrations were held in September and October 2009 to protests state cuts and layoffs at university campuses in California. Major protests held on September 24 and October 15 were against staff cuts, layoffs and student tuition and fee hikes.

Major protests against the tuition hikes broke out on November 18, 2009, after the Regents' vote and continued in the following days. Students held sit-down strikes, blocking cars from entering the universities. Students also hijacked several university buildings, locking themselves inside. Major protests broke out at UC Berkeley following the announcement of the tuition hikes in September 2009. In a series of actions on November 18–20, the UC Berkeley administration was seriously challenged by a series of militant actions on every major UC campus. On November 20 at UC Berkeley, 43 students locked themselves inside Wheeler Hall and held the building for 12 hours while thousands gathered outside for support and militant push-back against scores of riot police called in from several counties. One faculty member at UC Berkeley (Integrative Biology Professor Robert Dudley) was arrested while observing the protests. At UC Santa Cruz, over 100 students participated in a sit-in at the campus' Kerr Hall. They occupied the building for an entire three days before surrendering to police. No arrests were made. Demonstrators occupied an administration building at San Francisco State University for over 23 hours and led to clashes with police until they were eventually forced out. Although many professors remained complicit, some participated in the protests as well by not teaching in the days following the vote to raise tuition. Many professors and graduate students continued to teach classes but incorporated short "teach-ins" in the 5–10 minutes at the end of class, to highlight the proposed (and since then, enacted) tuition increases. Teach-ins often contrasted the cost to attend UC compared to comparable private institutions like MIT and Harvard, as well as the salaries of top administrators (Mark Yudof compared to Susan Hockfeld and Lawrence Summers).

At UC Davis, 51 students and 1 faculty member were arrested at the main administration building. In December 2009 at UC Berkeley, hundreds of students re-took Wheeler hall for a week to hold open workshops, classes, and teach-ins. The series of events, known as "Live Week," forged an open-access model of education run horizontally and self-governed by the community of students, faculty, and workers. On December 11, 2009, Chancellor Robert Birgeneau and the UC Berkeley administration used the information it obtained about a concert by Boots Riley organized by students and community as a pretext to clear the building. 66 students were arrested at 4 am without dispersal order and taken to Santa Rita Jail. The legitimacy of all these actions is seriously contested in a number of lawsuits against the administrations.

On March 4, 2010, protests at UC Davis were met with police brutality when they attempted to march upon the I-80 freeway.

=== Violence Against Protestors ===
The UC administration responded with overwhelming police force to protests—police in riot gear from the university police departments, local county sheriff's offices, California Highway patrol and state police were regularly called out during campus protests.

On November 20, thousands of protesters gathered around Wheeler Hall at UC Berkeley in support of 43 students, who occupied the building and successfully shut down the operations of the university for the day. While the occupiers were defending the space from the inside, police unleashed unwarranted violence on students on the outside. They used batons and rubber bullets, injuring the unarmed bodies of hundreds of peaceful protesters and sending some to the emergency room with broken bones.

At the annual Regents' meeting on November 17 the next year at UCSF, the Regents voted another 8% increase while hundreds of police in riot gear used tear gas and batons to fend off protesters from disrupting the meeting. In a particularly heated moment, UCSF Police Officer Jared Kemper drew his gun in front of dozens of students, threatening to shoot at them.

More than 700 students and several faculty members were arrested across campuses between late 2009 and the middle of 2011.

== National Day of Action 2010 ==
The campaign inspired a call for a nationwide day of action against tuition increases and budget cuts on March 4, 2010. Dozens of actions took place around the country, most of which were peaceful, although some were violent. The largest actions took place in California, notably several large un-permitted marches around the San Francisco Bay Area that tied up traffic and sometimes led to conflict with police. The largest act of civil disobedience occurred when hundreds of protesters converged to blockade Interstate Highways 880 and 990 at Oakland during rush hour. 150 protesters were arrested and one was hospitalized. Protesters displayed a banner that read "Occupy everything," while shutting down the roadway for an hour, an action that has been described as a precursor to the Occupy movement.

== Aftermath ==
In the aftermath of the passage of state Proposition 30 in 2012, Governor Jerry Brown urged the trustees of UC and California State University to reconsider any further hikes with UC tuition remaining frozen for the next three years.

== See also ==
- 2010 University of Puerto Rico strike
