= Rafael Pietri Oms =

University of Puerto Rico chancellor (1921–2011)

- Born: July 16, 1921; San Germán, Puerto Rico
- Died: March 6, 2011 (aged 89); Mayagüez, Puerto Rico
- Occupations: Professor, Dean

Rafael Pietri Oms was Chancellor of the University of Puerto Rico at Mayagüez from 1974 to 1979.

== Education ==
Rafael Pietri Oms completed his bachelor's degree in agricultural sciences in 1942 in the former College of agriculture and mechanical arts of Mayagüez (CAAM). In 1947, he completed his graduate studies in soil chemistry at Texas A&M University From 1953 to 1957, he attended doctoral studies at the University of Missouri.

At the conclusion of his graduate studies, he began to work at the College. He was Professor, Dean of the College of agricultural sciences, and also the third rector of the institution, from 1974 to 1979.

He was the Puerto Rican campaign manager for Barack Obama in the 2008 United States presidential election.

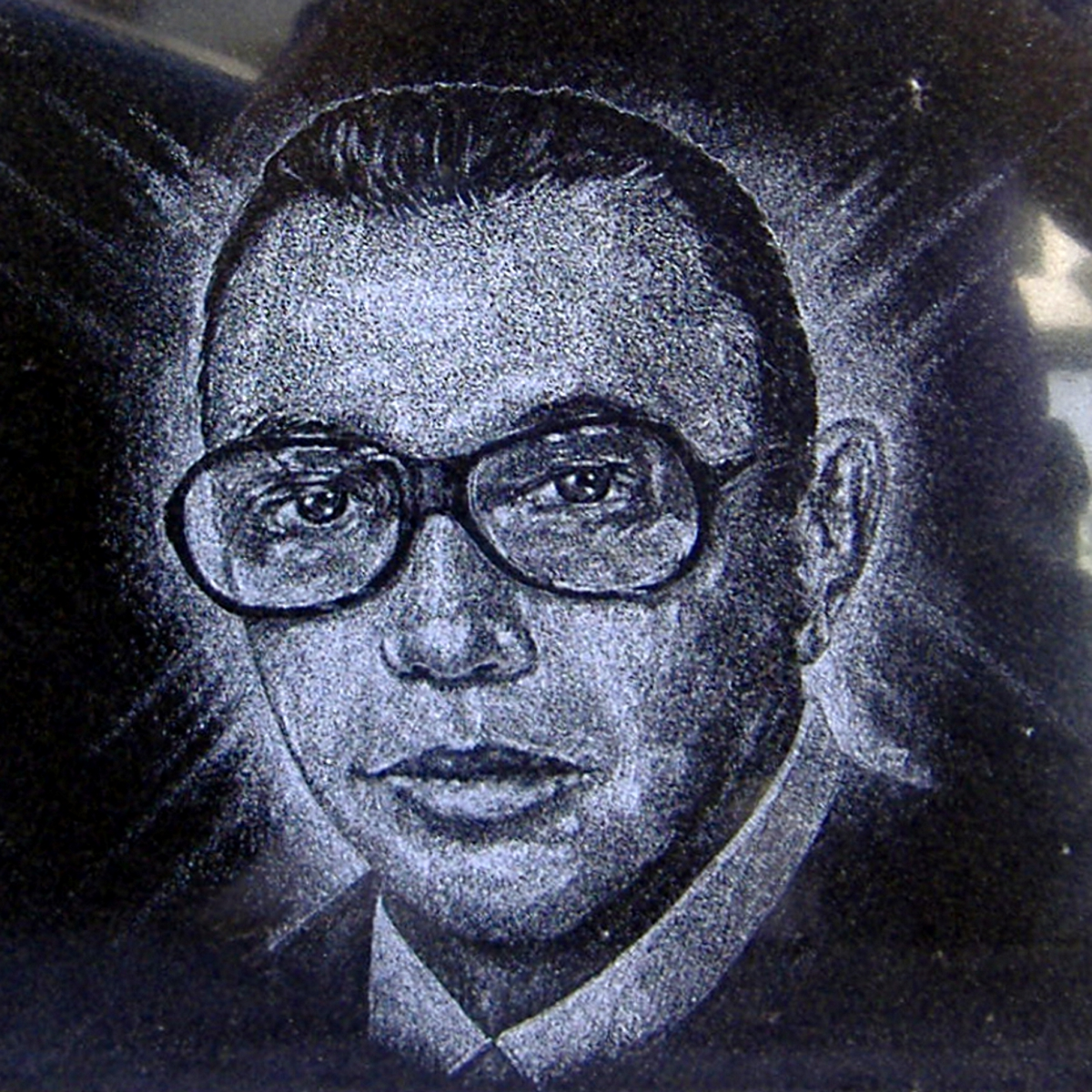
In youth

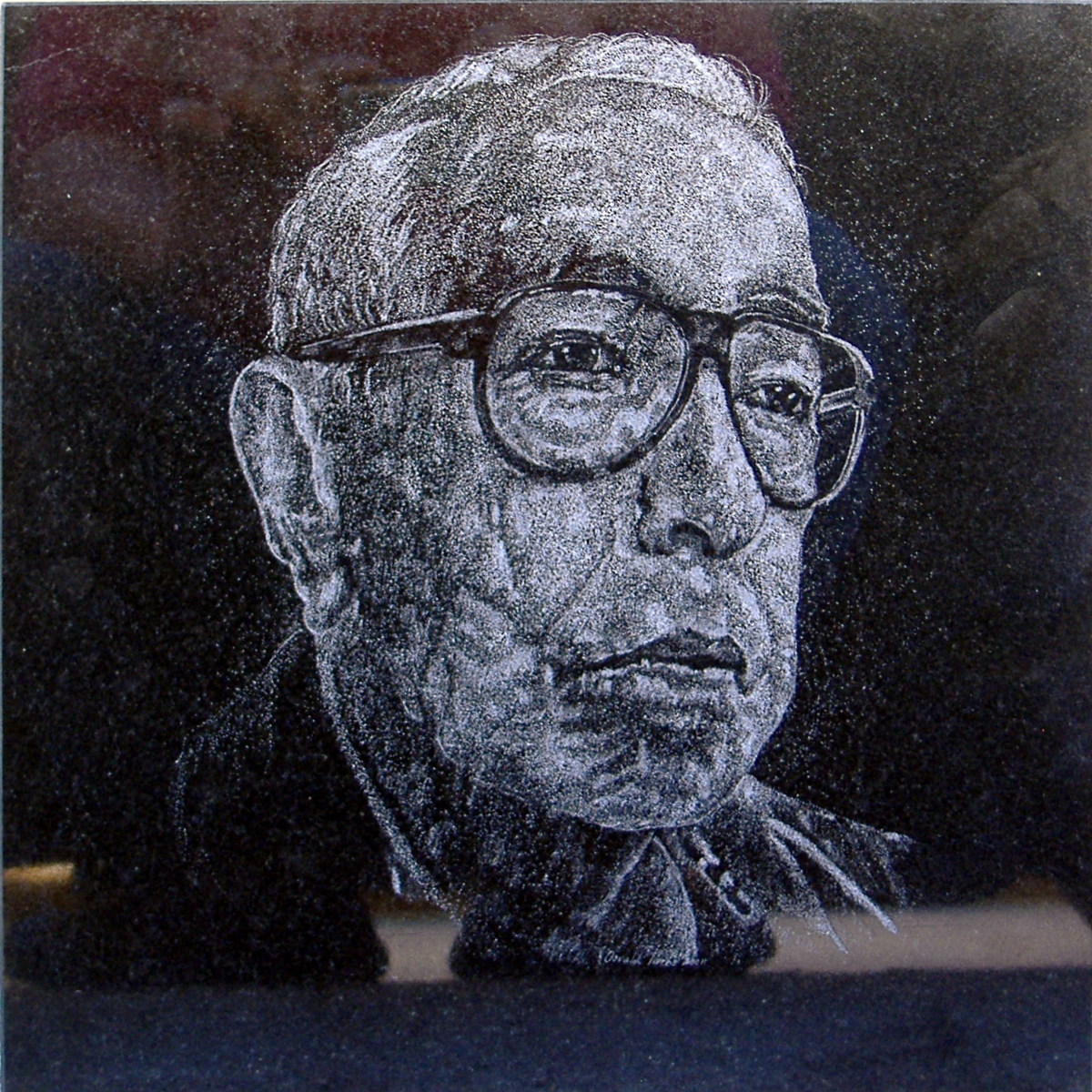
In old age

Hand-etched portraits of Pietri on black granite by Osvaldo Torres (Cruzacalles), on display at the Mayagüez City Hall

== See also ==
- List of University of Puerto Rico at Mayaguez people
