= University of Puerto Rico at Mayagüez =

Public university in Mayagüez, Puerto Rico

University of Puerto Rico, Mayagüez Campus
- Recinto Universitario de Mayagüez
- Former names: College of Agriculture and Mechanical Arts in Mayagüez
- Motto: ¡Antes, Ahora y Siempre...Colegio!
- Motto in English: Before, Now, and Forever...College!
- Type: Public land-grant university
- Established: September 23, 1911; 115 years ago
- Academic affiliations: Sea Grant, Space Grant, APLU
- Endowment: US$107 million
- President: Zayira Jordán Conde
- Rector: Dr. Miguel Muñoz (interim)
- Faculty: 1,026
- Administrative staff: 1,336
- Students: 10,071
- Undergraduates: 9,251
- Postgraduates: 820
- Location: Mayagüez, Puerto Rico; 18°12′34″N 67°8′30″W
- Campus: Urban, 315 acres (127 ha)
- Colors: Green and white
- Nicknames: Bulldogs (outside the LAI); Tarzans/Tarzanes (men's teams); Janes/Juanas (women's teams)
- Sporting affiliations: LAI; NCAA Division II
- Mascots: Tarzán (male) and Jane (female), both bulldogs
- Website: www.uprm.edu

The University of Puerto Rico, Mayagüez Campus (UPRM) or Recinto Universitario de Mayagüez (RUM) in Spanish (also referred to as Colegio and CAAM in allusion to its former name), is a public land-grant university in Mayagüez, Puerto Rico. The UPRM is the second-largest university campus of the University of Puerto Rico system, a member of the sea-grant, and the space-grant research consortia.

In 2009, the campus population was composed of 12,108 students, 1,924 regular staff members, and 1,037 members of the education staff. In 2013, the student population remained relatively steady at 11,838, but the instructional faculty dropped to 684. In the second semester of 2019 around 12,166 students were enrolled. By the end of the academic year 2022-2023 there were 10,071 students enrolled. UPRM has been accredited by the Middle States Commission on Higher Education (MSCHE) since 1946.

== History ==
The University of Puerto Rico was created by an act of the Legislative Assembly on March 12, 1903, emerging as an outgrowth of the Normal School, which had been established three years earlier to train teachers for the Puerto Rican school system. In 1908, the benefits of the Morill-Nelson Act declared applicable to the island, fostered the rapid growth of the university. Evidence of that growth was the establishment of the College of Liberal Arts at Río Piedras in 1910 and the College of Agriculture at Mayagüez in 1911 as a land-grant university.

The founding of the institution is credited to D.W. May (Director of the Federal Experiment Station), José de Diego and Carmelo Alemar. In 1912 the name of the institution was changed to the College of Agriculture and Mechanic Arts or Colegio de Agricultura y Artes Mecánicas (CAAM).

In 1918, an earthquake and a fire caused significant damage to the institution. The ruins of the entrance of one of the buildings, Degetau Hall — which not only withstood the earthquake, but proved to be almost indestructible after the rebuilt hall was torn down in the late 1950s — would later become the emblem of the institution. In 1988, the archway (the portico) was rebuilt, landscaped and turned into a monument.

The campus rectory was located at the José de Diego building, the oldest standing edification within the campus, built in 1911. The building was inscribed in the National Historic Building Registry as an architectural patrimony. In 1940, a clock tower was built into the main building. In 1993, the building underwent a restoration.

In 1929, the Liga Atlética Interuniversitaria was created at the Mayagüez campus. The LAI is an athletic organization, similar to the NCAA, created with the purpose of promoting and regulating sports activities. It originally consisted of a three event competition: basketball, baseball and track and field. Currently the competition consists of more than 25 sports.

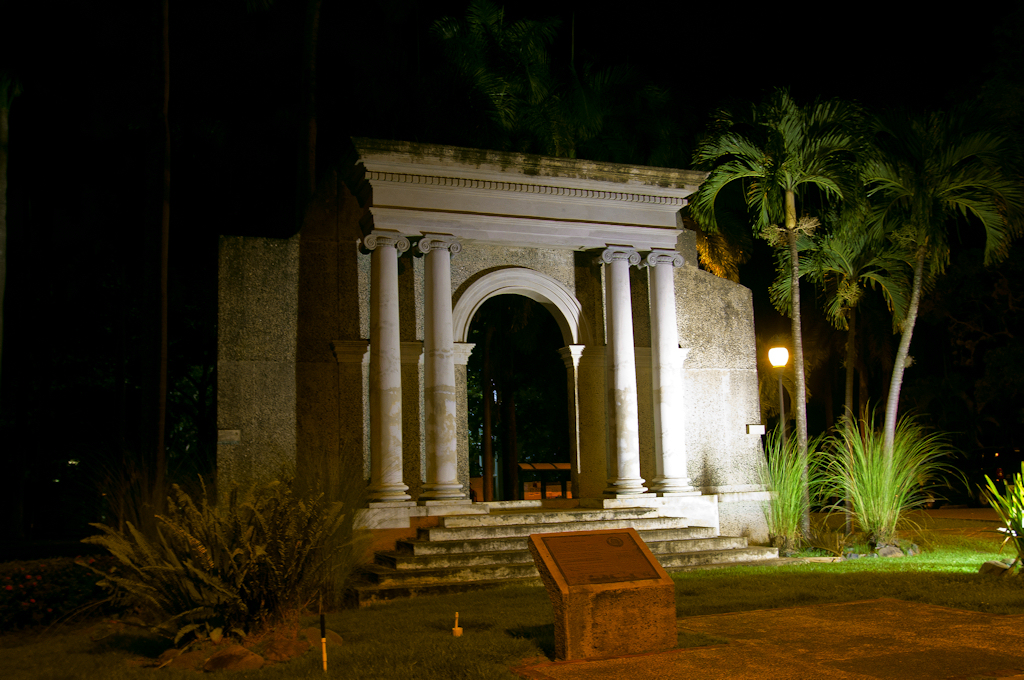
UPRM's portico.

In 1942 as a result of university reform, the campus was organized with a considerable degree of autonomy into the Colleges of Agriculture, Engineering, and Science under the direction of a vice-chancellor. In the 1950s the institution saw more programs added when the College of Arts and Sciences, and the Nuclear Center were established.

The Puerto Rican Legislative Assembly reorganized the University of Puerto Rico's system in 1966. This reorganization of the system led to the controversial change of its name to University of Puerto Rico – Mayagüez Campus, which is used to the present day as the official name of the institution.

In 2007, 35.4% of all Engineering degrees were granted to women at UPRM, one of the largest percentages in US universities. The University of Puerto Rico at Mayagüez is the second largest Hispanic-serving institution in the United States.

In 2010 the campus went on strike as part of the 2010–2011 University of Puerto Rico strikes. In 2017 in response to budget cuts to the university system by the Financial Oversight and Management Board for Puerto Rico the campus students voted to join the University of Puerto Rico strikes, 2017.

== Organization ==
UPRM consists of the Colleges of Agricultural Sciences, Arts and Sciences, Business Administration, Engineering, and the Division of Continuing Education and Professional Studies. The College of Agricultural Sciences includes the Agricultural Experiment Station.

=== Administrative board ===
The Administrative board of the Mayagüez Campus consists of the chancellor as presiding officer, the deans, two academic senators elected among those faculty members of the senate who are not ex officio, senators, and an elected student representative. The president of the university serves as an ex officio member. The board acts as an advisory body to the chancellor, prepares the development plan of the campus, approves the proposed budget prepared by the chancellor, and grants tenure, promotions and leaves of absence.

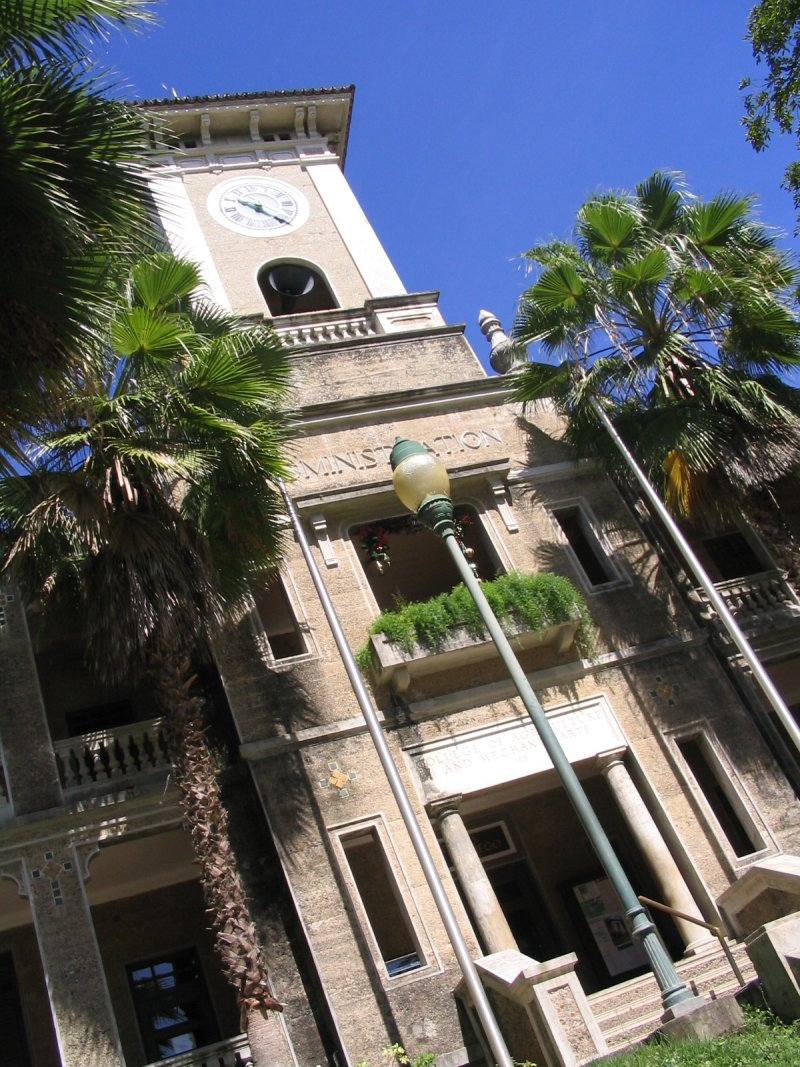
UPRM Central Administration Building.

	Dean	Years
1	Frank Lincoln Stevens	1911 -
2	Ralph Stillman Garwood	
3	Charles E. Horne	
	Joseph Axtamayer	-1943

	Vice - Chancellor	Years
1	Luis Stefani	1943–1965

	Chancellor	Years
1	José Enrique Arrarás Mir	1966–1971
–	José L. Martínez Picó	1971
2	Fred Soltero Harrington	1971–1973
–	Luis A. Rodríguez	1973–1974
3	Rafael Pietri Oms	1974–1979
–	Rafael Faría González	1979
4	Salvador Alemañy	1981–1984
5^{§}	José Luis Martínez Picó	1985–1989
–	Pablo Rodríguez	1990
6	Alejandro Ruiz Acevedo	1990–1993
–	Pablo Rodríguez	1993–1994
7	Stuart José Ramos Biaggi	1994–1997
8^{§}	Antonio Santos Cabrera	1997–1998
–	Omar Ruiz	1998
–	Fred V. Soltero Harrington	1998‐1999
9	Zulma R. Toro Ramos	1999–2001
–	Pablo Rodríguez	2001–2002
10	Jorge Iván Vélez Arocho	2002–2009
–	Jorge Rivera Santos	2010–2011
11	Miguel A. Muñoz Muñoz	2010–2011
12^{§}	Jorge Rivera Santos	2011–2013
13	John Fernández Van Cleve	2014–2017
14	Wilma L. Santiago Gabrielini.	2017–2019
15	Agustín Rullán Toro	2019–2026

^{§} Interim chancellor later made permanent

=== Academic Senate ===
The Academic Senate at UPRM is composed of the members of the administrative board, the director of the library, the director of the counseling office, representatives elected from the faculties whose total must not be less than twice the number of the elected ex officio members, an elected member of the Library and Counseling Office, and ten student representatives. The academic senate is the official forum of the academic community. Its main task is to participate in the formulation of academic processes within the university's legal structure.

== Campus ==
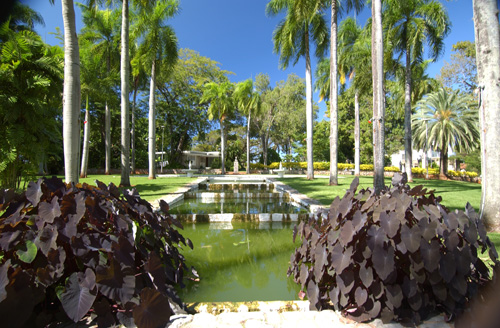
Chancellor House gardens

The UPR-Mayagüez campus encompasses approximately 315 acres (1.27 km2). The campus has a sports complex that includes a gym, a weight room, rooms for dance/aerobic classes, courts for basketball, a tennis and volleyball complex, a natatorium, an outdoor sports field and the Rafael A. Mangual Coliseum. The Hotel Colegial serves as the only on-campus dorms and is reserved for athletes. The campus offers two cafeterias, a bookstore, a Popular Bank branch, a lounge called La Cueva de Tarzán (Tarzan's cave) and a computer center, although several academic departments also operate their own computer laboratories. In 2016 after more than a decade in planning MUSA, a museum of art, was inaugurated on the campus. In 2019 a new cafe was opened in the College of Business Administration. The campus also contains the ruins of a historic structure called La Casilla del Caminero.

The Mayagüez Campus General Library serves the campus community as well as residents of Mayagüez.

== Academics ==
The University of Puerto Rico at Mayagüez consists of four major colleges:

- College of Agricultural Sciences
- College of Arts and Sciences
- College of Business Administration
- College of Engineering

UPRM offers 55 bachelor's programs, 44 master's programs, and 9 doctoral programs. The 5 most popular undergraduate bachelor's in the university are Mechanical Engineering, Biology, Industrial Engineering, Electrical Engineering, and Civil Engineering.

UPRM offers undergraduate and graduate education in all of their four colleges, while doctoral programs are only offered in the College of Arts and Sciences, and the College of Engineering.

The college of Agricultural Sciences includes the Agricultural Experiment Station and the Agricultural Extension Service.

UPRM College of Engineering graduation rates are higher than the University of Wisconsin, Texas A&M University, University of Washington and the University of Minnesota. It has increased the percentage of its faculty with doctorates from 66.5% in the 1999–2000 academic year to 79.4% in 2007. As of spring 2023, the campus had 634 instructional faculty (585 full-time and 49 part-time), which includes those who are tenured, on tenure-track, and not on tenure-track. In terms of student enrollment, a total of 10,071 students were enrolled (9,251 undergraduates and 820 graduates).

The Mayagüez campus is one of two land-grant universities in the tropics and the only one where Spanish is the native language (although English is also used extensively). The academic calendar has two semesters: fall (early August to mid-December) and spring (early January to mid-May). While textbooks and research materials used at the University of Puerto Rico are often in English, Spanish is the language of instruction in most courses at UPRM, and students are required to have a working knowledge of the English language. The individual professor decides the language used in class lectures and in student evaluation activities.

=== Research ===
UPRM is one of the important centers in the Atlantic region for the study of tropical marine science due to its location, facilities, and researchers. The research facilities includes the Puerto Rico Water Resources and Environmental Research Institute, the Caribbean Coral Reef Institute (CCRI), the Research and Development Center, the Agricultural Research Station and the Caribbean Atmospheric Research Center (ATMOSCarib).

The College of Engineering offers computerized laboratories for teaching, measuring fatigue and fractures in different materials, designing manufactured products and the processes to build them, and computer design. There is a Center for Civil Infrastructure used to design structures resistant to natural disasters and transportation systems. Other research areas include development of solar powered vehicles and boats, use of satellite photography to study earth phenomena, and study of the environmental impact of industrial toxins.

The Departments of English, Humanities, and Hispanic Studies also produce first-rate scholarship. Some of the most important fields include digital humanities, Caribbean cultural studies, and transnational topics.

In addition to the numerous research laboratories under direct faculty supervision, the Mayagüez campus has several research and development institutes that provide valuable support for research activities. Arts and Sciences is the college with the largest portfolio of funded research at the university and the highest number of patents, mostly from the Physics Department. Most of the science education funded efforts are in the following areas: science and mathematics education, detection of explosives, environmental sciences, biotechnology, ecosystems and conservation, oceanic processes, nanotechnology and advanced materials, human behavior and energy.

Its researchers, faculty, graduate and undergraduate students are at the forefront of areas such as tsunamis, nanotechnology, protein, oceanic processes, bio‐markers, coral reefs, applied economics, disasters, monitoring of seismic activity, biodiversity and physical oceanography.

The research facilities includes a campus-wide wireless network available to the whole university community (over 80 access points), Internet 2 Institution with an OC3 access line, video conference facilities, online course development platform, 42 academic computer labs for students (1,032 computers estimated), about 5,000 computers estimated including administrative, faculty and research facilities and a campus network backbone infrastructure interconnecting over 40 buildings fiber optics.

The Puerto Rico Seismic Network, in charge of monitoring seismic activity for the Caribbean region, is on the campus.

==== College of Engineering ====
The college is accredited by ABET. It is among the top 10 U.S. universities in the field of engineering in number of students enrolled.

The University of Puerto Rico at Mayagüez produces around 600 engineers every year. A National Action Council for Minorities in Engineering, Inc. (NACME) report for the 1996–1997 academic year indicates the University of Puerto Rico at Mayaguez graduated by far the largest number of Hispanic engineers.

== Student life ==
=== Athletics ===
UPRM's Tarzán paw logo

The university's mascot is a bulldog named Tarzán. Tarzans for men and the Janes for women sports team, respectively. The Mayagüez campus is a member of the LAI (Liga Atlética Interuniversitaria). It is the only university that participates in all sports sponsored by the LAI. It currently participates in 16 men's sports and 12 women's sports with a total of 373 athletes. Its main building is the Rafael A. Mangual Coliseum.

The campus has had an Olympic swimming pool in the Natatorio RUM and a Tennis Center since the 2010 Central American and Caribbean Games.

Since September 1, 2003, the Mayagüez campus competes as an independent university in the NCAA's Division II. It participates in men's basketball, baseball, cross country running, soccer, swimming, tennis, track (outdoor), volleyball, taekwondo, and wrestling and in women's basketball, cross country running, swimming and tennis.

=== Activities ===
The campus has over 100 student organizations. Some annual events include:

- Cinco Días con Nuestra Tierra (Five Days with Our Earth): Every March, agricultural students organize a five-day event in celebration of agriculture.
- Justas Intercolegiales (Intervarsity Games): Every April, there are athletic competitions between Puerto Rican universities.
- Cena Internacional (International Dinner): Every November all international students, the faculty and staff get together for a dinner.
- Encendido de la Navidad (Christmas Enlightening): Each December, students, faculty, staff, and community attend the tree lighting ceremony to start the Christmas holiday season on campus.

=== Radio Colegial ===
In 2007 a group of students from the Institute of Electrical and Electronics Engineers (IEEE)-UPRM Chapter, created an Internet Radio Station starting with one weekly radio program and then broadcasting its programming through a web portal

=== Student organizations ===
There are hundreds of student organizations in each faculty of the University of Puerto Rico Mayagüez Campus including but not limited to the following:

- American Society of Civil Engineers, UPRM Chapter - civil engineering student organization
- Coki Racing Team - student organization that designs and constructs a small-scale vehicle that operates by chemical means.
- Students for the Exploration and Development of Space, SEDS UPRM - space exploration student organization.
- Campus Verde - an environmental organization dedicated to spreading awareness of climate issues and how students can help protect the environment.
- SPECTRUM - LGBT student organization that has coordinated various drag shows.
- Creative Artistic University Workshop (Taller Artístico Creativo Universitario, TACU) - an artist student organization dedicated to providing materials and information with the end goal of helping artist present their works at annual expositions.
- Come Colegial - a student organization founded in 2014 that helps by providing food to disadvantaged students. In 2019 Come Colegial was extended to all the campuses of the University of Puerto Rico. The organization has continued to provide food during the COVID-19 pandemic in Puerto Rico.
- Hope for a Rescue - an animal rescue group.
- SIEMPREVIVAS - a feminist group that organizes support groups and provides services for victims of domestic violence.
- University Institute for the Development of Communities (Instituto Universitario para el Desarollo de las Comunidades, IUDC) - a student organization that carries out investigations and promotes community development around the island.
- Medicine Education Development, MEDLIFE UPRM - Medical students association that carries out charity work.

== Notable alumni ==
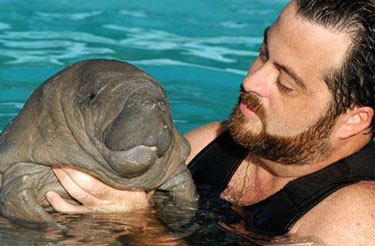
Antonio Mignucci, PhD 1996, a biological oceanographer specializing in the management and conservation of marine mammals

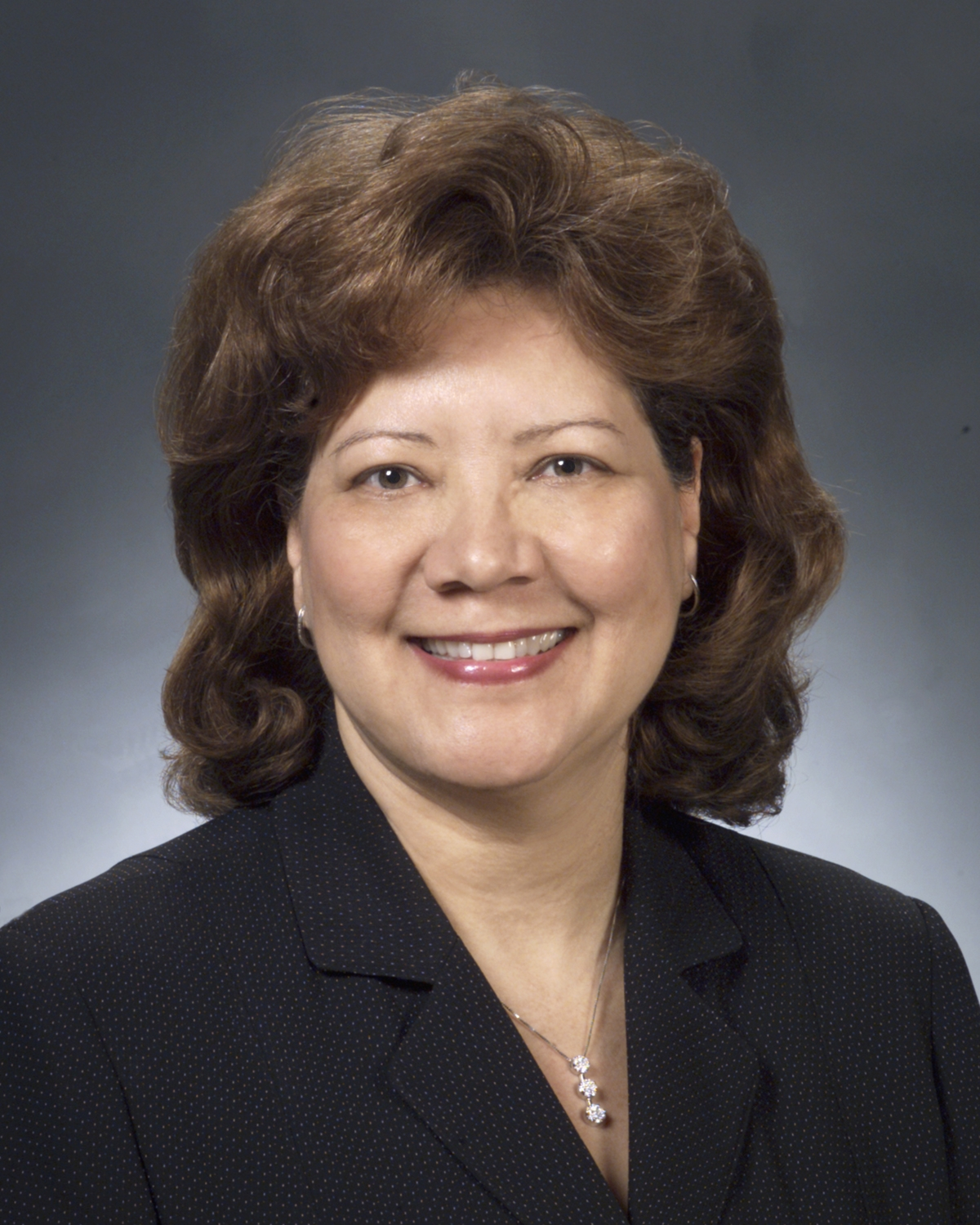
Olga D. González-Sanabria, BS, is the highest ranking Hispanic at NASA Glenn Research Center

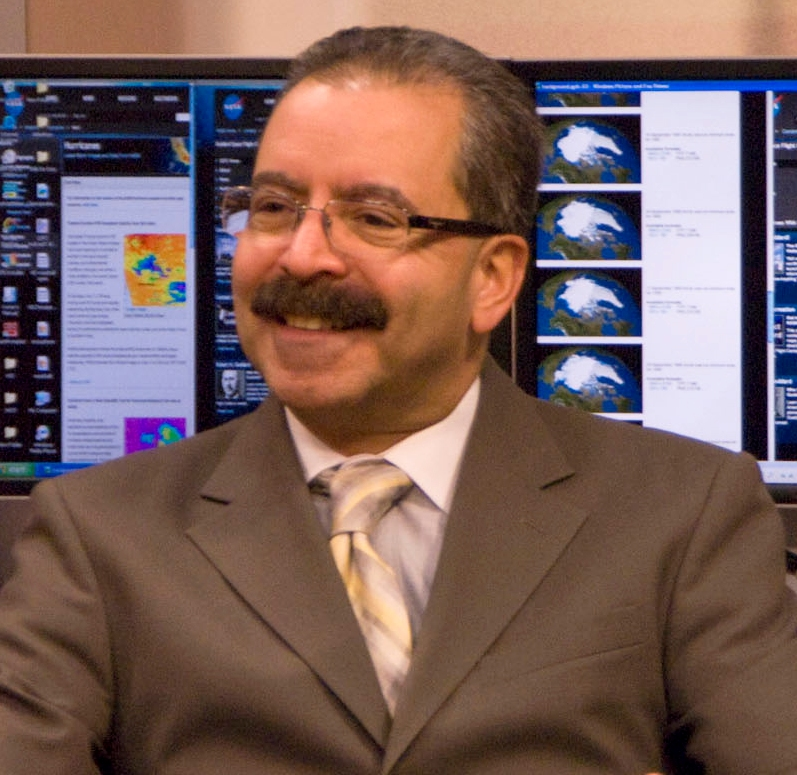
Orlando Figueroa, BS 1978, Director of the Mars Exploration Program in NASA

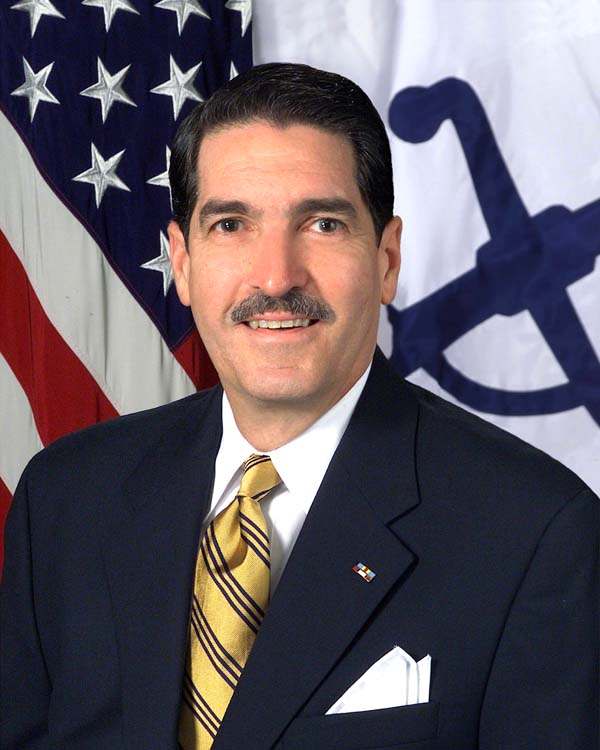
William A. Navas Jr., BS 1965, the first Puerto Rican to be named an Assistant Secretary of the Navy

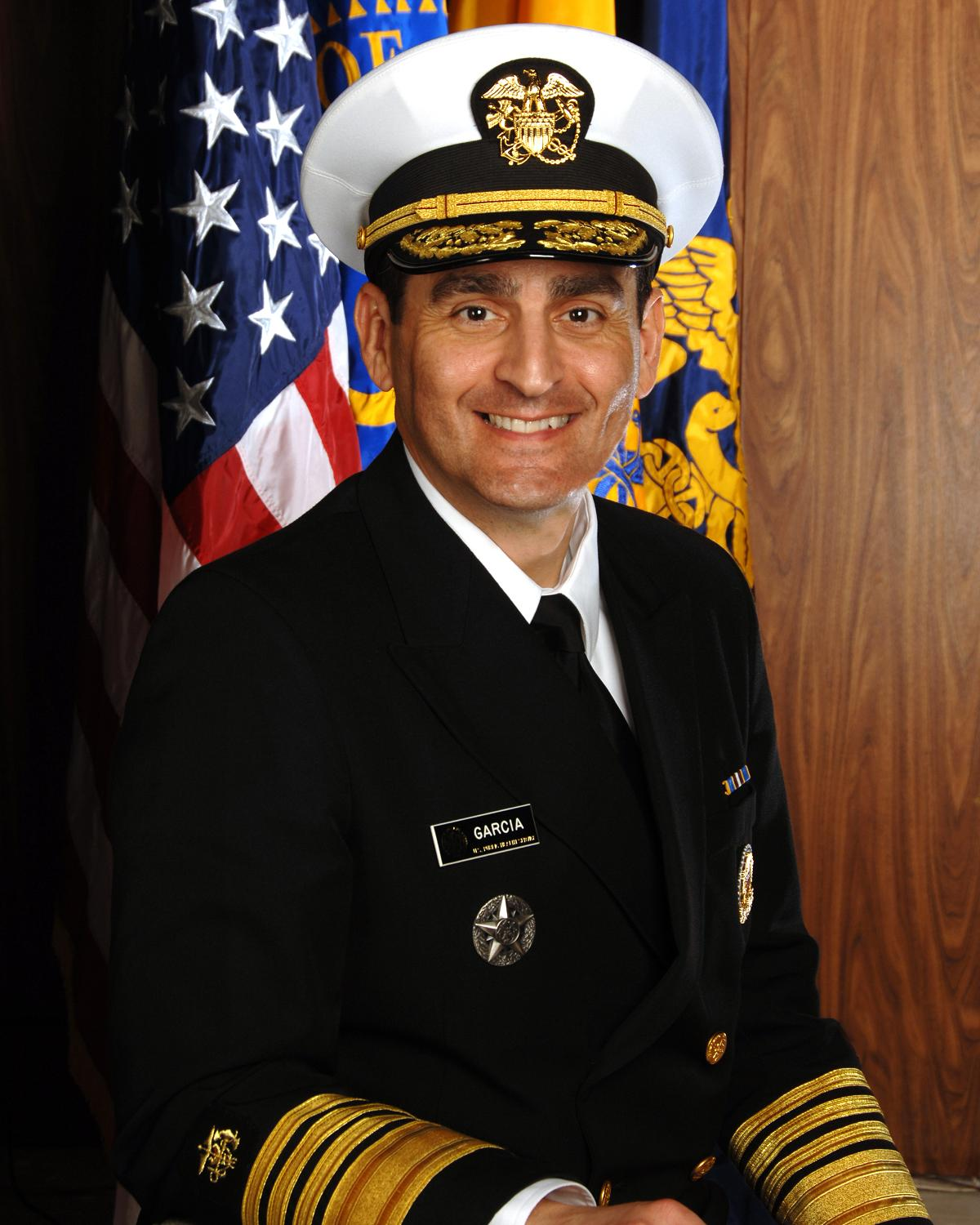
Joxel García, BS, former four-star admiral in the U.S. Public Health Service Commissioned Corps. He served as Assistant Secretary for Health and currently serves as the President of the Ponce School of Medicine

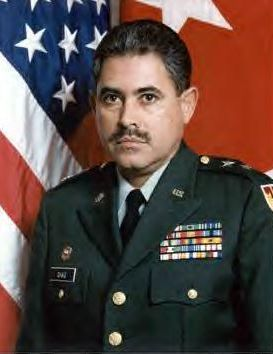
Emilio Díaz Colón, Adjutant General of the Puerto Rican National Guard and later the Superintendent of the Puerto Rican Police Force.

== See also ==
- University of Puerto Rico strikes, 2010–2011
