= WPUC-FM =

Radio station in Ponce, Puerto Rico

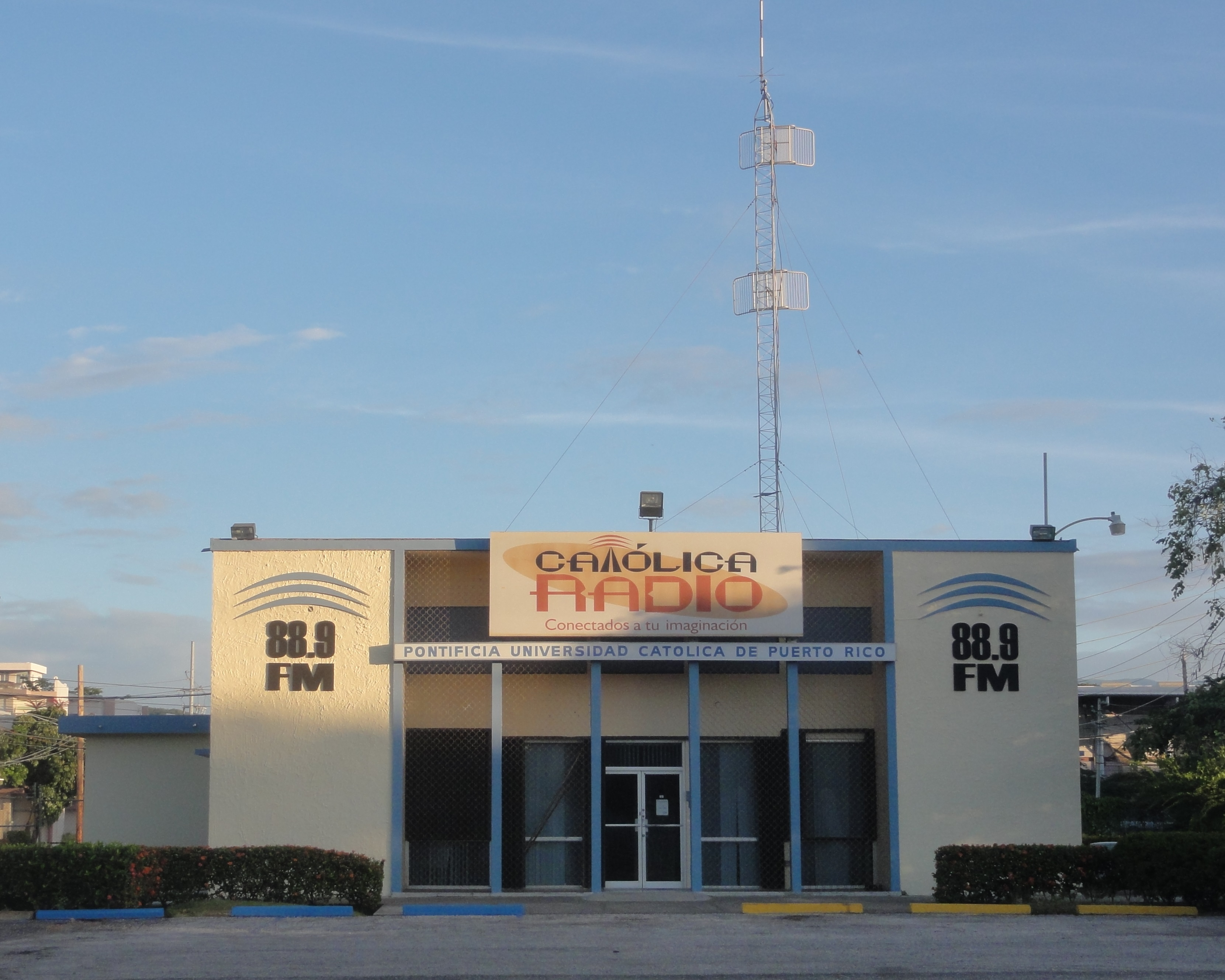
- Ponce, Puerto Rico; Puerto Rico
- Broadcast area: Puerto Rico
- Frequency: 88.9 MHz
- Branding: Católica Radio

Programming
- Languages: Spanish and English
- Format: Adult Contemporary

Ownership
- Owner: Pontifical Catholic University of Puerto Rico; (Pontifical Catholic University of Puerto Rico Service Association, Inc.)

History
- First air date: 1958; 68 years ago (as WEUC AM 1420); May 17, 1984; 42 years ago
- Former call signs: WEUC-FM (1982–2000)
- Call sign meaning: Pontifica Universidad Catolica de Puerto Rico

Technical information
- Licensing authority: FCC
- Facility ID: 9351
- Class: B
- ERP: 12,000 watts
- HAAT: 827.0 meters (2,713.3 ft)
- Transmitter coordinates: 18°10′27″N 66°35′32″W
- Translator: 89.1 W206AF (Mayaguez)

Links
- Public license information: Public file; LMS
- Webcast: Listen Live
- Website: catolicaradiopr.com

WPUC-FM (88.9 MHz), branded on-air as Católica Radio, is a non-commercial educational radio station broadcasting an Adult Contemporary format. Licensed to Ponce, Puerto Rico, the station serves the entirety of the island with the aid of a booster at Caguas and a translator covering Mayagüez. The station is owned by Pontifical Catholic University of Puerto Rico Service Association, Incorporated.

== History ==
The Catholic University of Puerto Rico entered into broadcasting when it built WEUC, a 1,000-watt AM radio station operating at 1420 kHz, in 1958. The station, which signed on in May, was the island's first Catholic radio station. The station's call letters stood for Emisora Universidad Catolica (Catholic University Station). Bishop James E. McManus, who founded the university, had invited Father Carl Hammond to assist in the design of the buildings on the campus; Hammond, an avid ham radio operator, was instrumental in launching the station.

On May 17, 1979, the Catholic University of Puerto Rico applied to the Federal Communications Commission to build and launch a noncommercial FM station on 88.9 MHz. WEUC-FM was approved by the commission on January 11, 1982, but the station did not sign on the air until May 17, 1984.

The university sold the AM station in 2000 to El Mundo Broadcasting Corporation, owners of WKAQ-AM-WKAQ-FM in San Juan and WUKQ-FM in Mayagüez, for $1.45 million; the sale resulted in the AM frequency becoming a simulcaster of WKAQ. After selling the AM station, the university changed WEUC-FM's call sign to WPUC-FM, reflecting the papal designation of the pontifical title on the university, which had taken place in 1991.

The radio station serves dual purposes: as a communication media with the external community and as an internship for students studying communications. In 2014, the station's main studio was named for Luis Varela (1938 - 23 June 2020), whose sports program Trinchera Deportiva aired from WEUC/WPUC since 1961.

After Hurricane Maria, WPUC-FM lost 80 percent of its coverage. The translator for Mayagüez, located inside the Maricao State Forest, was returned to service in January 2019.

== Translator stations ==
Broadcast translators for WPUC-FM
Call sign	Frequency	City of license	FID	ERP (W)	FCC info
WPUC-FM1	88.9 FM	Caguas, Puerto Rico	9353	.25	LMS
W206AF	89.1 FM	Mayaguez, Puerto Rico	9350	.25	LMS

== See also ==
- Radio Colegial: University of Puerto Rico-Mayaguez
- WRTU: University of Puerto Rico-San Juan
