= José de Diego =

Puerto Rican politician and writer (1866–1918)

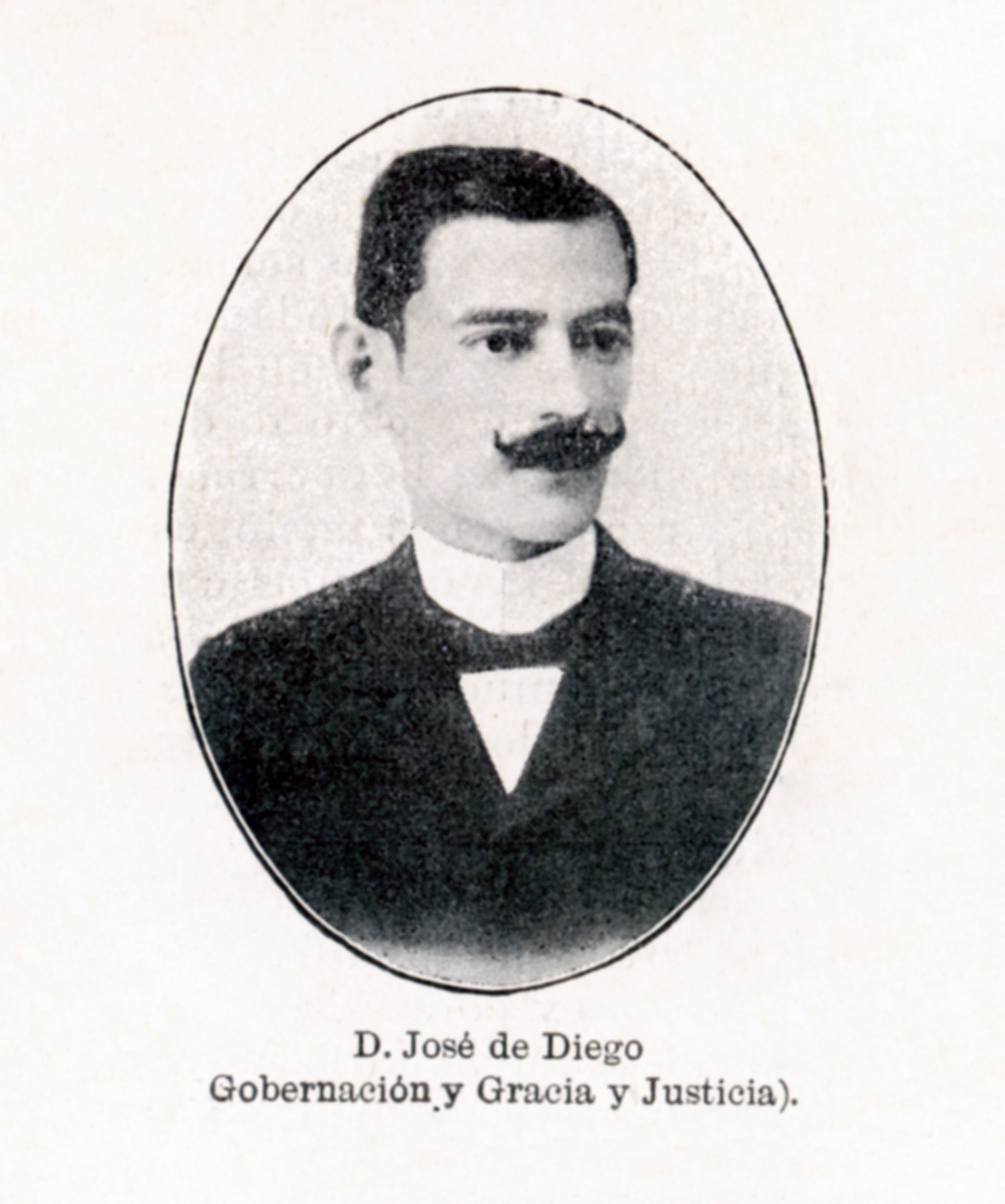
- De Diego in 1898
- Born: April 16, 1866; Aguadilla, Puerto Rico
- Died: July 16, 1918 (aged 52); New York, New York, United States
- Resting place: Santa María Magdalena de Pazzis Cemetery
- Education: Polytechnic College of Logroño; University of Barcelona; University of Habana (JD)
- Occupations: Statesman, poet, attorney, legislator, journalist
- Spouse: Georgina Blanes
- Children: José, Elisa Estrella, Georgina
- Writing career
- Language: Spanish
- Period: 1881–1918
- Notable work: A Laura

Signature
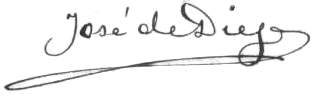

José de Diego y Martínez (April 16, 1866 – July 16, 1918) was a Puerto Rican statesman, journalist, poet, lawyer, and advocate for Puerto Rico's political autonomy in union with Spain and later of Puerto Rican independence from the United States who was referred to by his peers as "The Father of the Puerto Rican Independence Movement".

== Early years ==
De Diego was born in Aguadilla, Puerto Rico. He was the son of Felipe de Diego Parajón, a Spanish Army Officer from Asturias, Spain, and Elisa Martínez Muñiz, a native of Puerto Rico. De Diego studied at the Aguadilla Elementary School before being sent to Spain to finish his education at the Instituto Politecnico de Logroño. While in Spain, de Diego attended the University of Barcelona to study law and collaborated with the newspaper El Progreso (Progress), founded by fellow Puerto Rican José Julián Acosta y Blanco, which attacked the political situation in Puerto Rico; this led to various arrests which lead to his being expelled from the University of Barcelona and eventually forced to leave Spain. He then returned to the island of Puerto Rico. Some time after his arrival in Puerto Rico he traveled again to Cuba to continue his studies at the University of La Habana where he completed his degree in law.

== Poetry ==
In 1886, de Diego had an unhappy love affair which led him to write "A Laura" ("To Laura"). This poem became very popular among the romantics of that time. He became known as the "Father" of the "Modern Puerto Rican Poetry Movement". Among his most noted poetry books are:

- Pomarrosas
- Jovillos
- Cantos de Rebeldía
- Cantos del Pitirre

== Confederation of the Spanish-speaking islands in the Caribbean ==
De Diego returned to Spain and studied law in Barcelona. However, he did not finish his studies there and transferred to the University of Havana in 1891, where he received his degree the following year. He then returned to Puerto Rico to advocate for its autonomy from Spain. The 1876 Spanish Constitution created a centralized state, and ended the ancient system of Autonomies and commonwealth kingdoms. Many in the wealthier regions such as Catalonia, Galicia, the Basque Provinces, Cuba, Philippines and Puerto Rico sought to reinstate it. It coincided with the growth of the republican sentiments. De Diego set up his law practice in Arecibo and was the founder of the newspaper La República (The Republic). Together with Román Baldorioty de Castro, de Diego founded the Autonomist Party in 1887. Luis Muñoz Rivera and Rosendo Matienzo Cintrón, who were members of the party, formed a committee which ultimately convinced the Spanish "Liberal Fusionist" Party leader Práxedes Mateo Sagasta to support the idea of autonomy for Puerto Rico within the Spanish kingdom. De Diego did not accompany Muñoz Rivera and Matienzo Cintrón because he was an antimonarchist: he believed that Spain should be a Federal Republic and Mateo Sagasta's party followed the ideals of the monarchy. De Diego envisioned the establishment of a Confederation of the Spanish-speaking islands in the Caribbean which would include the Dominican Republic and Cuba, known as the Antillean Confederation. In 1897, the Spanish Parliament granted the Charter of Autonomy to Puerto Rico, pursuant to Art. 82 of the Constitution of Spain acknowledged, after Mateo Sagasta's election as Prime Minister. Puerto Rico became a Spanish Autonomous Province. Muñoz-Rivera became the chief of the autonomous cabinet of the government and Minister or Justice and Grace, De Diego followed Muñoz Rivera's accomplishment and was named Vice-Minister of Justice and Grace. Puerto Rico's autonomy, however was short-lived, being subsequently invaded by the United States.

== Politician ==
José de Diego, together with many republican intellectuals, initially saw the American occupation with a positive attitude. They thought they would become American citizens with the same rights as the citizens in the mainland United States. He even wrote poems on the topic. However, after the American occupation began in October 1898, the racist attitude of the US military made him rethink his ideals. On June 5, 1900, President William McKinley named de Diego, together with Rosendo Matienzo Cintrón, José Celso Barbosa, Manuel Camuñas, and Andrés Crosas to an Executive Cabinet under U.S.-appointed Governor Charles H. Allen. The Executive Cabinet also included six American members. De Diego resigned from the position in order to pursue the island's right to govern itself. In 1904, he co-founded the Unionist Party along with Luis Muñoz Rivera, Eduardo Georgetti, Rosendo Matienzo Cintrón and Antonio R. Barceló.

De Diego was then elected to the House of Delegates, the only locally elected body of government allowed by the U.S.. De Diego presided the house from 1904 to 1917. The House of Delegates was subject to the U.S. President's veto power and voted for the island's right to independence and self-government and against the imposition of U.S. citizenship to Puerto Ricans, among other resolutions passed. None of these requests were honored by newly developing US hemispheric expansionism. In 1914, Barceló, Muñoz Rivera and de Diego were members of an executive council that attempted to form an alliance between the Union and Republican Parties. In 1917, after Luis Muñoz Rivera died, Barceló became the leading force behind the liberal ideas of the island. Barceló and De Diego were against the creation of the Jones-Shafroth Act which would impose United States citizenship upon the citizens of Puerto Rico because the act represented an impediment to Puerto Rican independence as a final status solution and because the judicial and executive branches would still be controlled by the United States. The Jones-Shafroth Act, however was approved by the United States and signed into law by President Woodrow Wilson on March 2, 1917. The Union Party under Barceló's leadership then resolved to adopt a different stance and to seek more autonomy which he believed would finally lead to independence. This move prompted de Diego's, who was a strong independence advocate, to have great differences with the majority of his party members. De Diego became known as the "Father of the Puerto Rican Independence Movement". He was considered by Puerto Rican Socialist Party founder Juan Marí Bras to be the bridge between the two "great ideological pillar[s] for independence" Ramón Emeterio Betances and Pedro Albizu Campos, in the 19th and 20th Centuries, respectively.

== Later years ==
In 1892 he was married to Doña Petra de la Torre Berríos at the Catedral de San Felipe Apóstol, in her hometown of Arecibo. This marriage was later annulled by the Roman Catholic Church. On 10 November 1900 he married Georgina Blanes in Mayagüez, with whom he had three children.

De Diego founded the "Colegio de Agricultura y Artes Mecánicas de Mayagüez" now known as "University of Puerto Rico at Mayagüez".; he travelled throughout the Caribbean and Spain seeking the support from what he called "Los hermanos de la misma raza" (Brothers of the same race) for Puerto Rico's independence. After giving a speech in Barcelona in to such a request, he became known as the "Caballero de la Raza" (The Gentleman of the Race). José de Diego's left leg developed gangrene, due to him suffering from filariasis (round worms) and was amputated in 1916. He died in New York City on July 16, 1918, of endocarditis. His remains were returned to Puerto Rico and are buried in the "Cementerio Antiguo de San Juan" (Santa Maria Magdalena de Pazzis Cemetery), in San Juan, Puerto Rico.

== Legacy ==
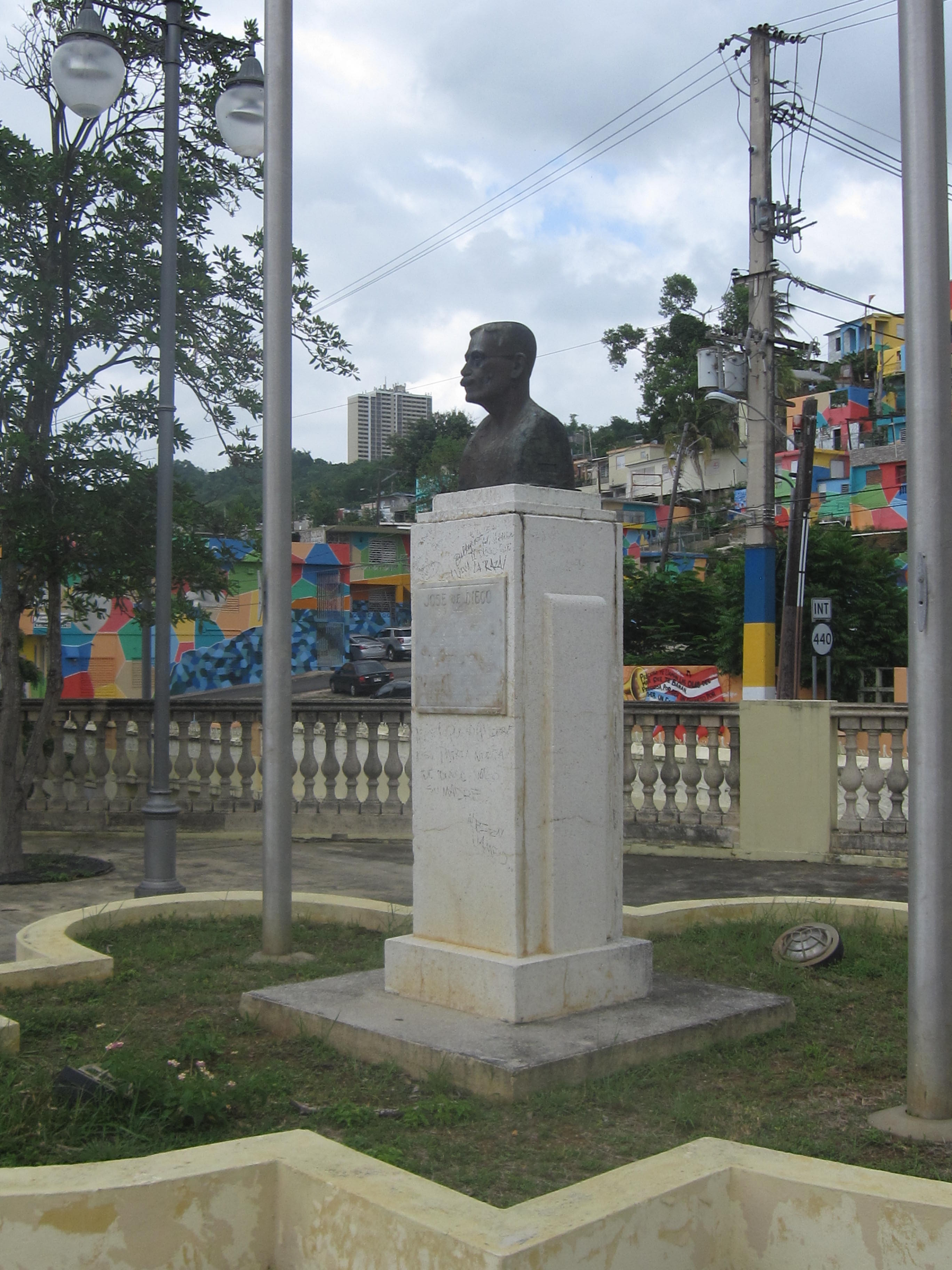
Statue of José de Diego in the plaza in Aguadilla barrio-pueblo

José de Diego's memory has been honored in Puerto Rico by having his birthdate observed as an official holiday as well as the naming of schools, avenues, and a highway after him. The plaza in his hometown of Aguadilla, the Plaza José de Diego, is named in his honor plus there are schools in Chicago, Illinois, Brooklyn, New York, and Miami, Florida, named after him.

== Partial bibliography ==
- Pomarrosas. Barcelona: Imprenta de Henrich y Ca. en Comandita, 1904.
- El caso de Puerto Rico y el Bill de tarifas. San Juan: Puerto Rico Progress Publishing, 1913.
- Jovillos. Barcelona: Editorial Maucci, 1916.
- Cantos de pitirre. Palma de Mallorca: Imprenta Mosen Alcóver, 1950.
- Cantos de rebeldía. Barcelona: Editorial Maucci, 1916.
- Obras Completas. Nuevas Campañas, el Plebiscito. San Juan de Puerto Rico: Instituto de Cultura Puertorriqueña,
- Obras Completas. Poesía. Vol. 2. San Juan: Instituto de Cultura Puertorriqueña, 1973.
- Antología Poética. Palma de Mallorca: Ripoll, 1977.
- La obra literaria de José de Diego, San Juan: Margot Arce De Vázquez, Instituto de Cultura Puertorriqueña, 1967

== See also ==
- Edificio José de Diego
- List of Puerto Ricans
- List of Puerto Rican writers
- Puerto Rican literature

Political offices
| Preceded by Francisco P. Acuña y Paniagua | Speaker of the Puerto Rico House of Representatives; 1907–1918 | Succeeded by Juan Bernardo Huyke |
Legal offices
| Preceded by None | Associate Justice of the Puerto Rico Supreme Court; 1898–1899 | Succeeded by Angel Acosta Quintero |
