= UPRM College of Engineering =

The UPRM College of Engineering is one of four colleges of the University of Puerto Rico at Mayaguez. This school is also the largest of its kind in Puerto Rico, with an enrollment of about 5,000 undergraduate students and about 400 graduates. It is the main producer of Hispanic engineers in the United States of America, according to the American Society of Engineering Education (ASEE).

== Academics ==
=== Departments ===
The School of Engineering currently consists of seven departments:

- Electrical and Computer Engineering Department
- Computer Science and Engineering Department
- Civil Engineering and Surveying Department
- Engineering Science and Materials Department
- Industrial Engineering Department
- Mechanical Engineering Department
- Chemical Engineering Department
