= Oceanic physical-biological process =

Hydrodynamic and hydrostatic effects on marine organisms

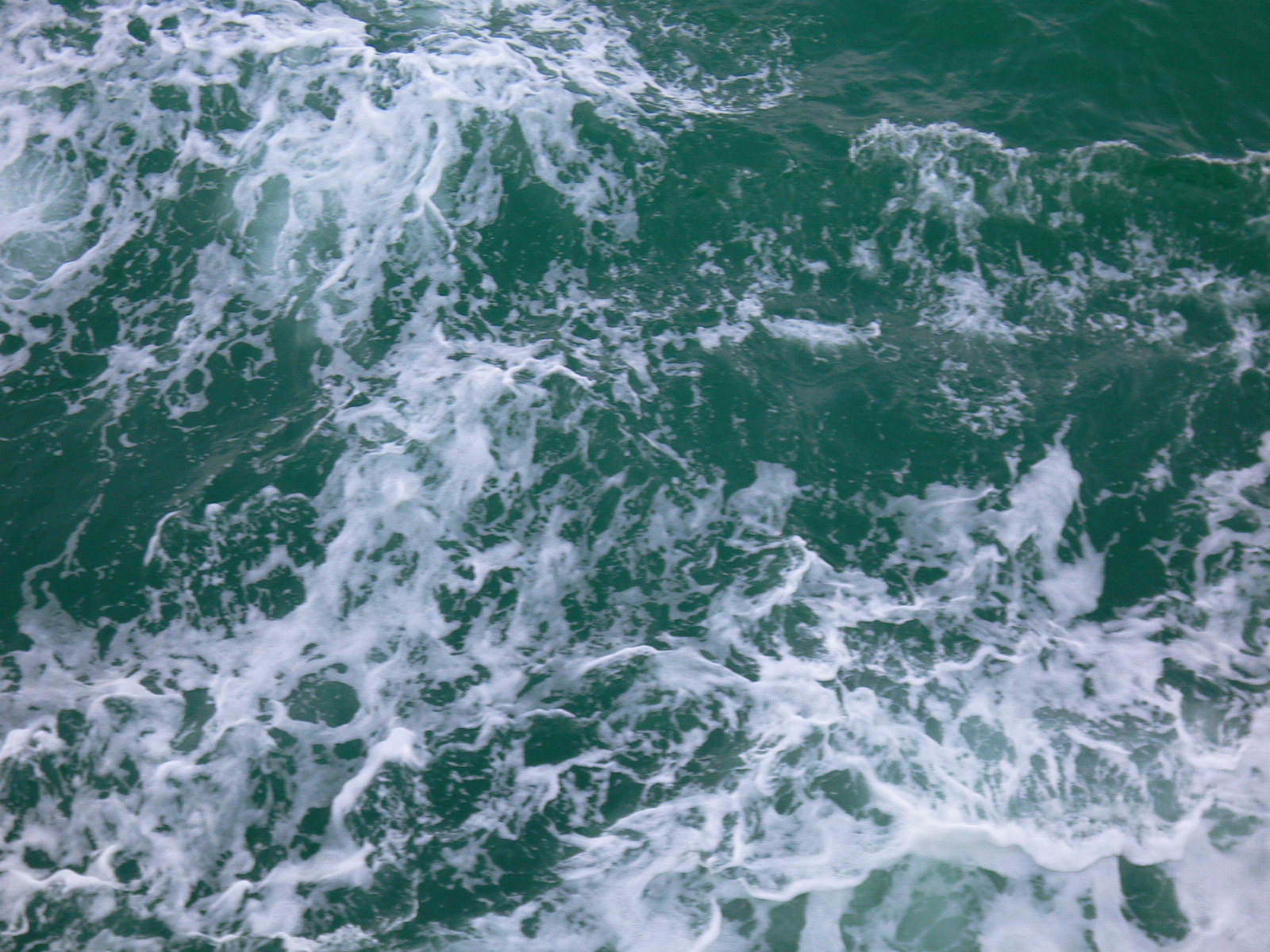
Sea water is 827 times denser than air.

Due to the higher density of sea water (1,030 kg m^{−3}) than air (1.2 kg m^{−3}), the force exerted by the same velocity on an organism is 827 times stronger in the ocean. When waves crash on the shore, the force exerted on littoral organisms can be equivalent to several tons.

== Roles of water ==
Water forms the ocean, produces the high density fluid environment and greatly affects the oceanic organisms.

1. Sea water produces buoyancy and provides support for plants and animals. That's the reason why in the ocean organisms can be that huge like the blue whale and macrophytes. And the densities or rigidities of the oceanic organisms are relative low compared with that of the terrestrial species. The water environment allows the organism to be soft, watery and huge. To be watery and transparent is a successful way to avoid predation.
1. Sea water can prevent desiccation although it is much saltier than fresh water. For oceanic organism, not like terrestrial plants and animals, water is never a problem.
2. Sea water carries oxygen and nutrients to oceanic organisms, which allow them to be planktonic or settled. The dissolved minerals and oxygen flow with currents/circulations. Oceanic plants and animals easily capture what they need for their daily life, which make them 'lazy' and 'slow'.
3. Sea water removes waste from animals and plants. Sea water is cleaner than we can imagine. Because of the huge volume of ocean, the waste produced by oceanic organisms and even human activities can hardly get the sea water polluted. The waste is not only 'waste' but also an important food source. Bacteria remineralize and recycle the organic matter back to the main oceanic food web.
4. Sea water transport organisms, which facilitates the food capture and fertilization. Many settled bottom organisms use their tentacles to catch planktonic food.

== Reynolds number ==
Water flow can be described as laminar or turbulent. Laminar flow is characterized by smooth motion: neighboring particles advected by such a flow will follow similar paths. Turbulent flow is dominated by re-circulation, whorls, eddies and apparent randomness. In such a flow particles which are neighbors at one moment can find themselves widely separated later.

Reynolds number is the ratio of inertial forces to viscous forces. As the size of an organism and the strength of the current increase, inertial forces will eventually dominate, and the flow becomes turbulent (large Re). As the size and strength decrease, viscous forces eventually dominate and the flow becomes laminar (small Re).

Biologically there is an important distinction between plankton and nekton. Plankton are the aggregate of relatively passive organisms which float or drift with the currents, such as tiny algae and bacteria, small eggs and larvae of marine organisms, and protozoa and other minute predators. Nekton are the aggregate of actively swimming organisms which are able to move independently of water currents, such as shrimps, forage fish and sharks.

As a rule of thumb, plankton are small and, if they swim at all, do so at biologically low Reynolds numbers (0.001 to 10), where the viscous behaviour of water dominates and reversible flows are the rule. Nekton, on the other hand, are larger and swim at biologically high Reynolds numbers (10^{3} to 10^{9}), where inertial flows are the rule and eddies (vortices) are easily shed. Many organisms, such as jellyfish and most fish, start life as larva and other tiny members of the plankton community, swimming at low Reynolds numbers, but become nekton as they grow large enough to swim at high Reynolds numbers.

== Bernoulli's principle ==
Bernoulli's principle states that for an inviscid (frictionless) flow, an increase in the speed of the fluid occurs simultaneously with a decrease in pressure or a decrease in the fluid's potential energy.

One result of Bernoulli's principle is that slower moving current has higher pressure. This principle is used, for example, by some benthic suspension feeders. These smart guys dig holes like U tubes with one end higher than the other end. Because of bottom drag, as water flows over the bottom the lower tube opening has a lower fluid speed and thus a higher pressure than the upper tube opening. The benthic suspension feeder can hide in the tube as the pressure difference between the tube ends drives water and suspended particles through the tube.

The body shapes of many benthic creatures also exploit Bernoulli's Principle not only decrease the friction and drag but also to create lift when they move through the current.

== Drag ==
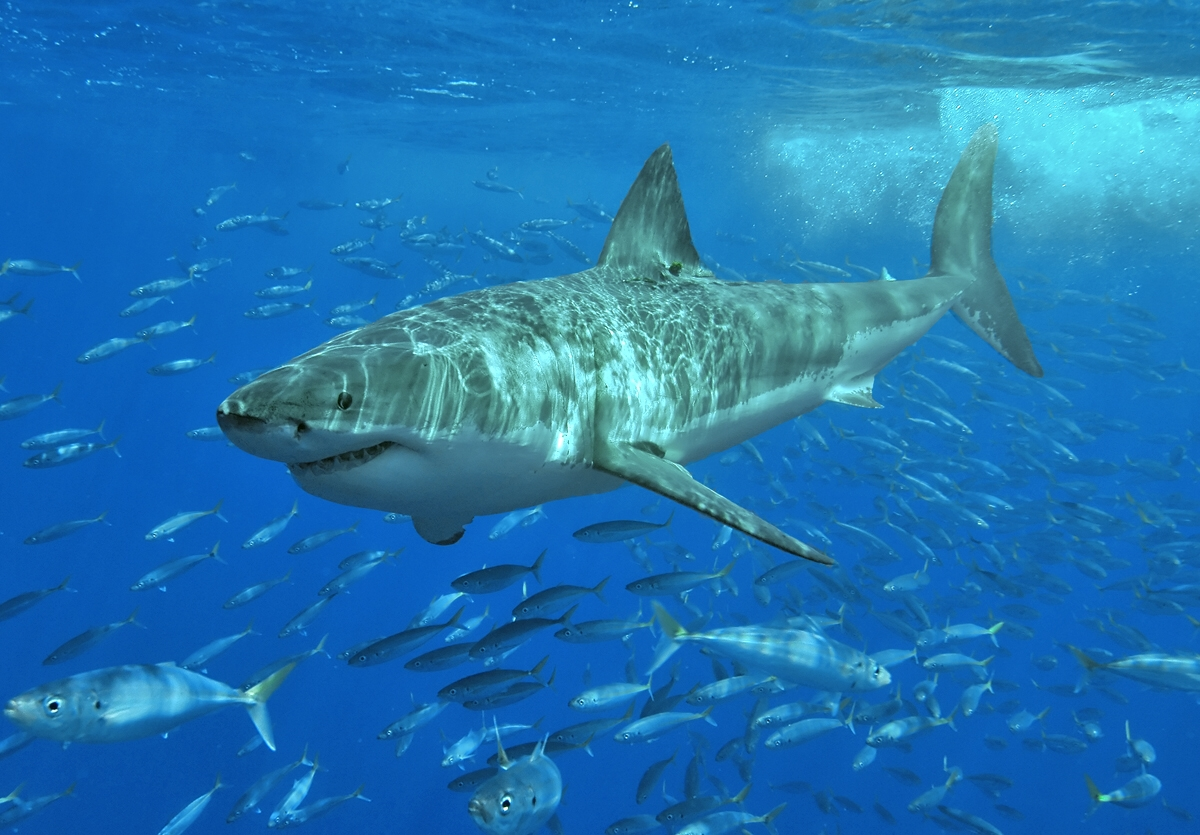
Great white shark

Drag is the tendency of an object to move in the direction of the flow. The magnitude of drag depends on the current velocity, the shape and size of the organism and the density of the fluid. Drag is a dissipative process which generally results in the generation of heat.

In sea water, drag can be decomposed into two different forms: skin friction and pressure drag.

1. Skin friction: just like other frictional forces, skin friction is a consequence of the relative movement between the surface of the organisms and its fluid environment. Under conditions of low Re, where viscous forces dominate, the skin friction is apparent and is more important, although it is also present under high Re conditions.
2. Pressure drag: pressure drag is a result of the pressure difference in front of, and behind, an organism. Incidentally, the shape that has the lowest pressure drag coefficient is a hollow hemisphere oriented in the direction of fluid flow. In the oceanic environment plants and settled animals have bodies that are soft and flexible in order to minimize the effects of pressure drag.

Besides being soft and flexible, organisms have other methods to minimize drag.

- Smooth skin: dolphins have little tear drops in their skin which traps some water so water flows over the water that is trapped. The skin feels soft and flaky and sheds every two hours. This helps dolphins swim through the sea water at high speed.
- Shark skin: the surface of shark skin is covered with tiny 'teeth' or dermal denticles. The shape and positioning of these denticles varies across the shark's body, altering the flow of water in a way to minimize form drag.
- Barracuda skin: Barracuda have hundreds of skin conduits which force the fluid flows to follow the parallel tubes and become laminar. Again, this arrangement decreases water drag.
