= Cinco Días con Nuestra Tierra =

Annual agricultural fair held at the University of Puerto Rico at Mayagüez

- Genre: Agricultural Fair
- Location: Mayagüez, Puerto Rico
- Founded: 1977
- Patron: UPRM
- Website: ciag.uprm.edu/5dias

Feria Agrícola Educativa Cinco Días con Nuestra Tierra is a five-day agricultural fair held every year in the University of Puerto Rico at Mayagüez. The event is organized by students, alumni, professors, and personnel, with the university collaborating on the institutional level and in other matters. Hundreds of people attend the fair daily, the majority consisting of school excursions, environmentalist and agricultural clubs, elderly groups, churches and general public interested in learning about agriculture. Local agencies also participate, such as the Autoridad de Desperdicios Sólidos, Servicio de Extensión Agrícola and the Puerto Rico Department of Agriculture, among others.

== History ==
The Feria Agrícola Educativa Cinco Días con Nuestra Tierra began being celebrated in 1977, organized by students, professors and associations of the agriculture faculty of the university. The event at its beginning took place in the lobby of the "Jesús T. Piñero building", main building of the College of Agricultural Sciences since then the fair has evolved into one of the most important agricultural fairs in Puerto Rico.

The COVID-19 pandemic caused the 2020 event to be cancelled and the 43rd was deferred to 2021.

== See also ==
- Agricultural show
- Livestock show
