= Rafael A. Mangual Coliseum =

Sports arena in Mayagüez, Puerto Rico

Coordinates: 18°12′46.85″N 67°08′37.99″W

Rafael A. Mangual Coliseum Coliseo Rafael A. Mangual
- El Mangual
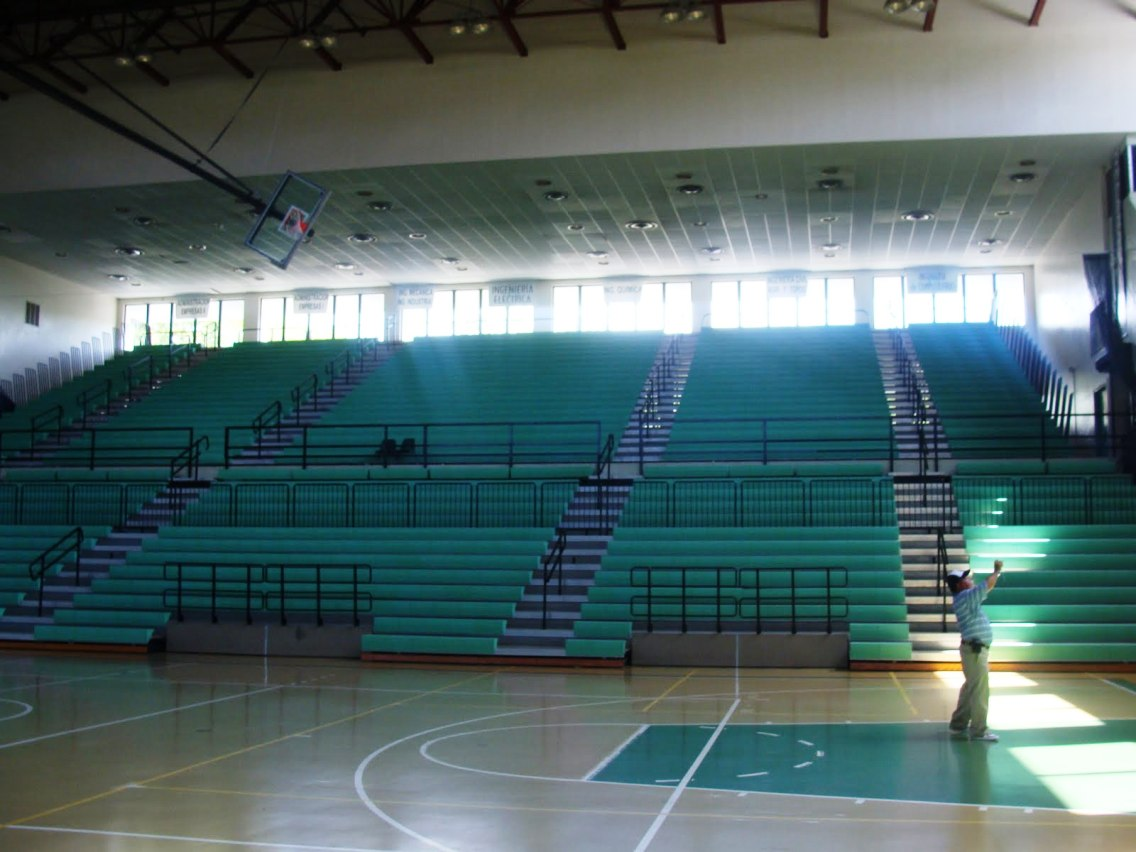
- Inside the Coliseum
- Interactive map of Rafael A. Mangual Coliseum; Coliseo Rafael A. Mangual
- Full name: Coliseo Rafael A. Mangual
- Location: Mayagüez, Puerto Rico
- Owner: University of Puerto Rico at Mayagüez
- Operator: University of Puerto Rico at Mayagüez
- Capacity: 5,500
- Field size: 51,037 sq. feet

Construction
- Built: 1974
- Opened: 1974
- Architect: Henry Klumb

Tenants
- Puerto Rico-Mayagüez Tarzans and Janes

The Rafael A. Mangual Coliseum (Spanish: Coliseo Rafael A. Mangual) is a sports arena in Mayagüez, Puerto Rico. It was inaugurated in 1974 and was designed by Henry Klumb. The Coliseum is managed by the Physical Education Department of the University of Puerto Rico at Mayaguez.

== Events ==
Many sporting events are held there such as basketball, volleyball and others. Many Academic, Cultural and Business activities are held at the arena, including the University Graduation ceremonies each June, concerts from the Puerto Rico Symphony Orchestra and University Job Fairs. The boxing events for the 2010 Central American and Caribbean Games were held there.
