= 2010–2011 University of Puerto Rico strikes =

Student strikes which took place between April 2010 and June 2010 at UPR campuses

The 2010–2011 University of Puerto Rico strikes (UPR) refer to the student strikes which took place between May 2010 and June 2010 in ten of the university system's eleven constituent institutions, as well as the protests that occurred from October 2010 to February 2011.

The 2010 strike began as a 48-hour walk-out on April 21, 2010, at the Rio Piedras Campus. The strike quickly grew in size and support as other campuses joined the protest. The strike forced UPR's Río Piedras Campus to shut down for more than 60 days.

== Financial issues ==
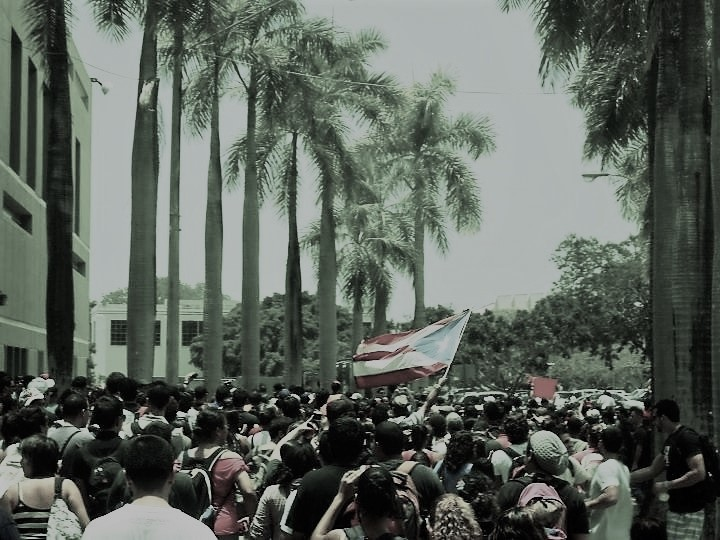
Student Assembly at UPRM

The UPR operating costs are provided by a variety of sources, including federal, state, and private grants and tuition and fees paid by students; however, they are mostly provided by the state government based on a fixed formula of 9.6% of the average collections deposited in the government's General Fund during the preceding two years, which was established in the university's organic law in 1966.

On March 3, 2009, Governor Luis Fortuño announced his Fiscal and Economic Recovery Plan, which included reducing the government's annual expenditures by more than $2 billion at the start of the next fiscal year in July 2009 and possibly laying off up to 30,000 public sector workers. Eventually, 12,505 were laid off. In 2007 and 2008, the General Fund collections ceased to grow, and even began to diminish, as a recession took hold of Puerto Rico's economy.

Several new revenue streams, that had been created in fiscal control laws signed by Governor Aníbal Acevedo Vilá in 2006, were excluded from the General Funds and were not part of the base used for UPR's formula-based state revenues. Following the implementation of Law #7, declaring a Fiscal Emergency, government revenues going to the General Fund were further diminished or were reassigned to other areas of the budget. The property tax 5% temporary surcharge, the income tax 5% temporary surcharge, half of the revenues of the IVU tax sent to the Compelling Interest Fund Corporation (COFINA in Spanish), and the stabilization fund, which is basically a loan and not revenue, are excluded from the revenue base used in the computation of the formula.

The government's budget for this year exceeded $9 billion. Governor Fortuño stated in his Budget Message that, had the 1966 formula been based on expenditures and not revenues, the university would have been assigned approximately $864 million and not $733 million. He said that by dividing the $730 million from the budget of expenditure, the formula-based appropriation is close to 8.1% of expenditure, although it remains 9.6% of General Fund revenues.

In order to ameliorate the effect that a reduction on recurring revenues has had on the UPR budget, Gov. Fortuño made two non-recurring grants from the temporary ARRA federal funds, of $105 million and of $25 million, during the first two fiscal years of his term.

On September 25, 2009, the government announced it would lay off thousands of government workers from various agencies. On September 28, 2009, a General Student Assembly was held, prompted by the magnitude of these layoffs. This assembly created action committees for every college. It also decreed several days of strikes, and joined the so-called "National" Strike celebrated on October 15, 2009.

These action committees were validated by Student Assemblies (held in venues with a maximum capacity much lower than the size of the student bodies), in September 2009 and again in April 2010. These committees have played a key role in the 2010 UPR-RP strikes. In almost every instance, vote by secret ballot has been opposed by the General Student Councils.

== On strike ==
=== Rio Piedras General Assembly ===
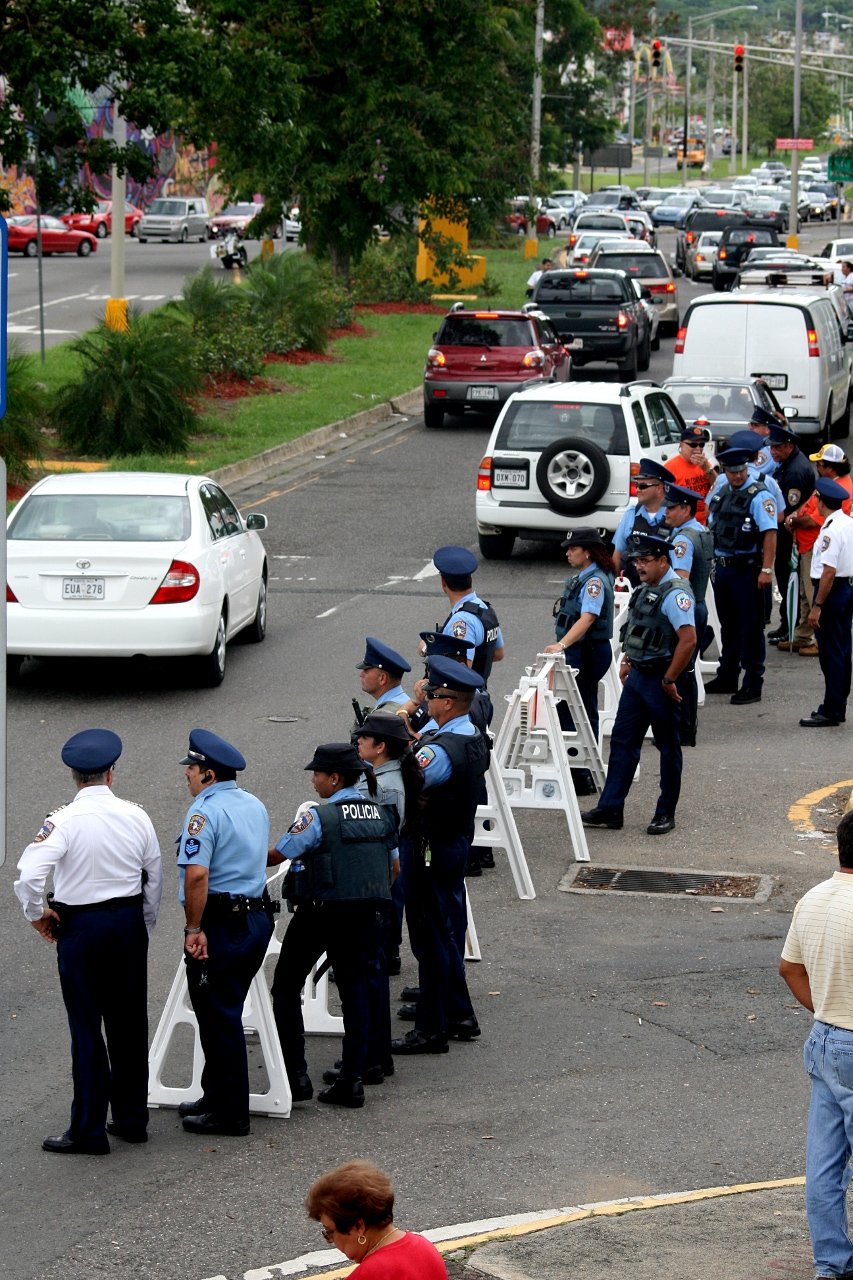
Police near protests at the Río Piedras campus

The General Student Council of the Rio Piedras campus held a General Assembly of Students on Tuesday, April 13, 2010, at the UPR-RP Theatre. Due to student overflow, the assembly was simultaneously held at Amphitheater Number 1 at the School of Education.

In assembly, students approved a motion to create a Negotiating Committee which would be delegated to discuss several issues with the university administration. The students demanded a repeal of Certification 98, put into order by the board of trustees, which made changes to the student waiver policies by limiting them. These policies would waive some payments related to tuition and other additional fees. Students were also opposed to tuition fee increases and demanded guarantees that campuses would not be privatized.

A call to strike was approved to pressure the administration to talk to and negotiate with students. The strike would last 48 hours starting on April 20, 2010, and if the administration failed to comply with student demands, an indefinite strike would begin on April 23, 2010.

=== Mayaguez General Assembly ===
Students from the Mayagüez Campus of the University of Puerto Rico also held a general assembly, in which they ratified the indefinite strike vote. The ratification vote led to a long and heated debate during the assembly, as students took turns in favor and against the strike. Students also deliberated on whether to vote by secret ballot or by hand vote. The vote for indefinite strike was ratified by an evident majority of the students through a hand vote. With this vote for strike, Mayagüez students joined the 9 other campuses, including Rio Piedras, on a campus-wide indefinite student strike.

The Medical Sciences Campus was the only campus to remain operational throughout the strike.

== 48-hour strike ==
Before the strike began, members of the Negotiating Committee of students attempted unsuccessfully to meet with President José Ramón de la Torre and Interim Chancellor Ana R. Guadalupe, but the administration maintained its stance in favour of the quota and budget cuts.

The strike on the Rio Piedras Campus began on the morning of April 21, 2010; between 4:00 a.m. and 6:00 a.m. students closed off access to the campus by locking all gates and building improvised barricades. Students clashed with university guards that tried to prevent the students from closing the gates. Interim Chancellor Guadalupe ordered an indefinite shutdown of the campus around 9:35 a.m., and denounced that 19 university guards were harmed in the takeover.

The Administration refused to meet up with the students in those 48-hours, therefore students activated their vote for an indefinite Strike to begin at midnight of 23 April.

== Indefinite strike ==
Students at 10 of the 11 campuses continued their protests. On May 3 the professors and students of the Cayey campus joined the indefinite strike. At the Rio Piedras campus students remained inside throughout the strike, using portable showers and stoves in their makeshift camps. Desks and chairs continued to barricade university gates for weeks, while student dorms were taken over by students. In May demonstrators and police clashed outside the Sheraton Hotel where a PNP fundraising event, which the governor Luis Fortuño attended, was taking place. During June, In the midst of the strike, UPR President de la Torre announced a 24-hour ultimatum for the strike to end. Students, however, continued their protests. During the strike, there were also several reports of police preventing students camping inside from receiving food and water.

At first, negotiations stalled for weeks. When the Negotiating Committee was finally able to meet with UPR administrative officials, including the President of the Board of Trustees, Ygrí Rivera, and the UPR President, there was no apparent progress toward ending the student strike.

=== Tuition fees ===
After negotiations had almost ended the strike, it was discovered that there was going to be a 100% estimated tuition hike. The hike, unveiled by the President of the Board of Trustees, Ygrí Rivera, made the previously negotiated achievements on the waivers or exemptions almost inconsequential. The administration "flexibilised" the hike, trying to make students agree with either a 100% tuition hike or a $1,300 Special Fee. The fee would be paid twice or three times a year, for a three-year period, and would be tied to a tuition fee increase after the three-year period, despite the fact that tuition increases are already in place until the 2015–16 academic year according to Certification 60.

In order to have the special fee approved, in July 2010 the government modified the board of trustees to increase their members from 13 to 17. Then, they imposed a special fee of $800.00 per year indefinitely.

== Support from other sectors ==
=== Local support ===
A group of Puerto Rican artists decided host a concert titled ¡Que vivan los estudiantes! on April 28, in support for the students on strike. Some of the artists present were Antonio Caban Vale (El Topo), Tito Auger, Los Rayos Gamma, Andy Montañez, Danny Rivera, and among many others. Rene Perez of the duo Calle 13 expressed his support and presented a video of artists who were supporting the students. Some of the artists in the video were: Ricky Martin, Ruben Blades, Juanes, Bebe, and Alejandro Sanz among others. More concerts were also held in other campuses, including Mayagüez, Cayey, Humacao and Bayamon.

On May 21, more than 1,000 professors from all 11 campuses met in a General Assembly. During that assembly, the professors voted to continue the strike should university officials end it by using police force against students. They also called for the resignation of the President of the UPR and of the President of the Board of Trustees, Ygrí Rivera. Non-teaching university employees also showed support to striking students, such as the Hermandad (HEEND) union and the Syndicate representing university maintenance workers.

=== International support ===
UNAM students have released communiques in favor of the student strike. Also students from the Dominican Republic published a letter on May 5, 2010, supporting the UPR students and their strike. Around 230 University of Barcelona students have signed a paper in favor of the strike too. The Pontifical Catholic University of São Paulo's School of Social Work Professors Association has expressed support in the struggle against "the destruction of education at the University of Puerto Rico", as have several student organizations from the Dominican Republic, and the Internationalist Clubs at CUNY.

=== Academic support ===
On April 27, professors from the Cayey campus went on a 72-hour strike in support of the students. On that same day, the students of the Cayey campus also approved a 72-hour strike.

On April 29, the Río Piedras campus chapter of the "Asociación Puertorriqueña de Profesores Universitarios" staged a one-day walk-out in support of the students, and called on its members to respect the picket line. On May 21, in a General Assembly of all the UPR professors agreed to making the strike an indefinite one until the university administration negotiated.

After a faculty meeting, professors from the Mayagüez Campus said that they did not trust their chancellor, Jorge Rivera Satos, on May 4 thanks to his unwillingness to negotiate with students and professors of the university.

The chancellor of the Arecibo campus, Ana Gómez, resigned to her job because José de la Torre asked her to do so after she supported the strikes. As a result, all the deans of the UPR Arecibo campus resigned from their positions.

The HEEND and the "Asociación Puertorriqueña de Profesores Universitarios" (APPU) also joined the strike. The president of the organization, Wilberto Jiménez Rivera wrote a series of articles in newspapers like "El Nuevo Día", where he expresses his solidarity with the strike.

On Friday May 21, the professors of all 11 campuses met in a General Assembly held at the Cayey Municipal Arena. There were about 1,100 professors members present. During that assembly, the professors voted to support the student strike. They voted to ask for the resignation of the President of the UPR and of the President of the Board of Trustees, the elimination of the 98 certification, the assignation of 9.6% of the government's money to the university, and they threatened the government by saying they were going to participate in the strike if the board of trustees did not reunite with them. They also expressed their objection to the presence of riot police aroundthe different campuses.

There were many professor like Julio Muriente, who used popular radio stations like Radio Isla to talk in favor of the students. The Brotherhood of nonteaching staff (HEEND) union, representing non-teaching employees, and the Syndicate representing university maintenance workers, also issued calls to their members to respect the picket lines.

=== Union support ===
There were other unions that actively participated in the strike, such as the Puerto Rico Federal Affairs Administration, and the Independent union of the authority of public buildings (UIAEP). They gave food and water to the students. Some of the syndicate groups such as the UTIER organized encampments to support the student protest.

== Media coverage ==
=== Rojogallito, Prensa Desde Adentro ===
In April 2010 student activist Aura Colon, along with several other students established Rojo Gallito Prensa Desde Adentro a blog and YouTube channel that would serve as the voice of the student movement publishing reports on the activities related to the strike. The domain (www.rojogallito.com) was donated for the publication of the groups material.

=== Radio Huelga ===
In need of a fast, reliable medium to communicate with a widely spread audience, a group of students from Rio Piedras Campus organized a worker's collective during the early days of the strike that started audio broadcasts through their own radio station, named Radio Huelga. The station's initial broadcast occurred at 4:00PM (AST) on May 2. Broadcasting from within the blocked Rio Piedras campus, producing a wide variety of shows (including its own soap opera, Amor de Barricada) and featuring many young, enthusiastic DJs, it shared relevant information about breaking news occurring at different campuses all over Puerto Rico during and after the strike. It also broadcast solidarity concerts from the Rio Piedras, Bayamón and Mayagüez campuses, as well as a "clandestine" acoustic program by members of the Puerto Rico reggae band Cultura Profética(which sneaked into campus at the moment where the Puerto Rico Police Department blockade was most stringent). They also featured solidarity broadcasts from former UPR students based in New York City, Amsterdam, and Barcelona.

Their live-streaming page (which can be viewed at: and ) received over 300,000 hits during the UPR strike. The student collective still maintains the radio station, in a 24/7 format.

Radio Huelga also broadcasts through a low-power AM station (1650AM), with a coverage radius of 1-square-mile (2.6 km^{2}). Due to FCC regulations the geographic coverage of the station is limited to the Hato Rey and Río Piedras subsections of San Juan.

=== Publicity campaign ===
UPR administration launched a series of advertisements on national newspapers, radio stations, and eventually TV stations. The ads varied each day, calling on the students to stop the strike, warning that a semester cancellation was due. They also asked the people of Puerto Rico to "not let foreign/strange elements" set the agenda of the UPR. Calling the student leaders liars, and people without honour, the ads then became more intense, using about eight students claiming that without the strike ending, they would not be able to graduate, continue studies, or get jobs.

Six economists estimated that the university's budget on advertising was around $5,200, however the administration has now spent close to a million dollars on advertising against the student strike.

The National Negotiating Committee also spent time doing their own advertisement. Just before the administration's advertisements came out, the NNC shot a commercial intended to encourage students (and now all of Puerto Rico since the strike turned into an island-wide issue) to keep supporting them.

== Legal proceedings ==
On 21 April the UPR Administration submitted an injunction against General Council President Gabriel Laborde, requiring him to open the gates of the UPR Río Piedras Campus. Afterwards, the administration tried to get Laborde jailed for contempt of court, saying he was not doing enough to open the university. Governor Luis Fortuño warned students they were in contempt of the court by continuing the indefinite strike.

After the 13th of May General Río Piedras Assembly ratified the strike to continue, by a 90% vote of the students present. The Administration proceeded to include in the injunction the entire Río Piedras Negotiating Committee, as well as the entire Board of the General Council including Gabriel Laborde, President; Santiago Velázquez, vice-president; Verónica Guzmán, Executive Secretary; María Mercedes Carruthers, Secretary; Arturo Ríos, University Board alternate and Rashid Marcano, Administrative Board alternate. The administration included another three students who acted as strike leaders, in the motion and demanded cessation of the conduct, as well as monetary reparations for the losses of the administration (calculated by them to be over $150 million).

After weeks, the judge decided to order both sides into mandated mediation with retired judge Pedro López Oliver. The students were represented by the National Negotiating Committee. From the administration side, the entire board of trustees was ordered to appear. On the night of June 16, 2010, after 5 days of court-mandated mediation, the board of trustees voted 9 to 4 in favor of entering an agreement with the students, attending their claims against the tuition increase/special fee, summary suspensions and expulsions, as well as the aforementioned issues about financial aid. Among those four members of the board who voted against the agreement (and declined to even sign the document) was board president, Ygrí Rivera.

== National Assembly ==
The National Negotiation Committee was formed to negotiate and represent students in the face of the administration. During June the parties meet in an attempt to end the indefinite strike. During these negotiations five students held a silent protest blocking the president of the university from leaving his office.

A National Student Assembly was called by the National Negotiating Committee for June 21, 2010. The National Assembly, the first of its kind in the history of Puerto Rico, was to decide whether to ratify or reject the agreements negotiated by the National Negotiating Committee and the UPR Administration on late 16 June 2010. The UPR Río Piedras General Council voted that same day to support the National Assembly.

Eight of the 11 campuses ratified the agreements in their own Student Assemblies held between June 17 and June 20. The National Student Assembly took place in the Juan Pachín Vicens Coliseum in Ponce, Puerto Rico. Only 2,900 students attended the assembly out of the 60,000 plus students of the University of Puerto Rico system. After a debate where some students argued that the terms were not acceptable and the strike should continue, the majority of students ratified the terms of the negotiation by the NNC (National Negotiating Committee) and the school's administration. During the event a minute of silence was held in memory of the student Natalia Sánchez who died outside a student assembly.

== Fall semester strikes ==
In October the board confirmed Ana Guadalupe as rector of the Río Piedras campus which students considered an act of defiance.

A student assembly at Río Piedras that took place in November 2010 passed a proposal for an additional 48-hour strike to be held December 7 and 8, with an option for an indefinite strike to start on December 14, 2010. Around 3 a.m. of that day, three Río Piedras' UPR students were arrested trying to jam the locks of several Natural Sciences and mathematics classrooms.

On the 1st of December a student assembly with a quorum of 1,760 students, approved a strike in the Río Piedras Campus on the 7-8 of December. In the early morning hours of December 6, 2010, the UPR administration's security guards attempted to take down the barricades around the Río Piedras campus after a series of confrontations which left multiple students and guards injured.

The 48 strike ended and classes resumed on December 9. The next day students in Ponce unanimously voted against a 48-hour strike.

Police presence in UPR:

Shortly after the December 7–8 strike, the Puerto Rican Police entered the Río Piedras campus, in a major departure from the university's long held No-Confrontation policy. Police presence on the campus remained large and they denied the press entry on December 14. On December 18 police where deployed to the Bayamon campus marking the fourth campus with police presence. The same day a judge rejected a student petition to ensure the strikes could continue within the UPR-RP. On December 13 the resident commissioner Pedro Pierluisi, called for an end to the strike and to resume dialogue between the UPR and the students.

Finally on December 14, another indefinite strike began at the Río Piedras campus. On the same day the student assembly in the Cayey campus approved joining the strike by a margin of two votes. This started a new phase of student protest at the University of Puerto Rico. As physical barriers, previously used by the students to enforce the May 2010 strike in "students inside, police outside" style, were no longer available (because the gates were removed and entrances controlled by heavy police presence), the strike was then run in a "students outside, police inside" way. The 16th of December on the third day of protest the students carried out a silent march through the campus. Some professors called for protest to demand an official assembly between all the professors. Students rallied inside and outside the campus, with protests reaching Plaza de las Americas. On December 20 at least sixteen students where detained but of these only eight faced charges. Negotiations between the administration and students continued to be delayed past December 27.

== Aftermath ==
The administration claimed that because of the cessation of activities, the university's financial situation worsened. The estimated loses of the institution surpassed $52 million by the summer of 2010.

In 2013 the UPR under governor Alejandro García Padilla eliminated the $800 quota. The measure went into effect on July 1, 2013, but by this date students had already paid $400.

== Strike in 2011 ==
=== 2011 Río Piedras campus strike events ===
The local media coverage on the deployment of "elite" Puerto Rican Police units inside and outside campus, showed images of students and other activists, allegedly arrested using excessive methods. Amnesty International asked the police to show restraint and respect students right to protest. This provoked general criticism against a police presence inside the Río Piedras campus. As part of the events taking place, students used smoke bombs to drive students out of their classrooms,

The protest and backlash against police presence on the campus resulted in the end of Jose Ramon de la Torre's term after he resigned to the Presidency of the UPR on February 11, as well as the removal of all tactical police units from the Río Piedras Campus, as ordered by Governor Luis Fortuño on February 14.

=== March 2011 events ===
On March 7, 2011, the level of campus violence reached the point where Río Piedras Chancellor Ana Guadalupe and the campus security chief were assaulted by students, notwithstanding the presence of journalists, photographers, and cameramen. Surrounded by angry students, a visibly shaken Guadalupe was hurried to a campus security vehicle, which was attacked by students, who broke vehicle windows and mirrors. The chancellor was taken from the scene to an area hospital, where she was treated for small wounds on her shoulder.

By May 2011 the strike, although not formally ended, had died out. One last act of defiance took place in the 2011 graduation ceremony, where a handful of law students, including 2010 student strikers, stood up, and turned their backs to Chancellor Guadalupe and President Miguel Muñoz. This act was copied by hundreds of undergraduate students during the undergraduate graduation ceremonies.

As of early 2012, rumors persisted of further strikes at the campus of Río Piedras of the University of Puerto Rico. If a strike was to develop along the pattern of the previous ones, it was likely to occur shortly before closing the second semester of the 2011–12 academic year. On March 13, 2012, during a student assembly members of the Unión de Juventudes Socialistas (UJS) tried to organize a vote for a definite-duration strike in favor, among other things, of free university education. Students called for a new assembly in April 2012. At that point, the March 13 assembly ended, in part because the necessary quorum was no longer present.

A new assembly was convened for April 11, 2012, but this one did not achieve the necessary quorum for action. The first student assembly of the 2012–2013 academic year, organized in October 2012, also failed to reach the necessary quorum.

== See also ==
- 1998 Puerto Rican general strike
- University of Puerto Rico strikes, 2017
- 2009 California college tuition hike protests
- Brusi, R. (2011). A new, violent order at the University of Puerto Rico, Graduate Journal of Social Science, Vol. 8, Issue 1.
- Everhart, Katherine (2012). Cultura-Identidad: The Use of art in the University of Puerto Rico Student Movement, 2010. Humanity & Society, Vol. 36, Issue 3.
- Student Strike
- University of Puerto Rico, official website
