= University of Puerto Rico strikes, 2017 =

2017 University of Puerto Rico strikes
- Date: 28 March 2017 - 7 June 2017
- Location: University of Puerto Rico; 18°24′10″N 66°3′1″W
- Caused by: University budget cuts
- Methods: University wide strikes
- Status: Ended

The 2017 University of Puerto Rico strikes were a series of student strikes which began on 28 March 2017, when the university's campus at Rio Piedras declared a one-week shutdown, from 28 March to 5 April followed by an indefinite strike, which began on 6 April. The strikes come as a response to a budget cut of $450 million to the public university system, proposed by the controversial Puerto Rico Oversight, Management, and Economic Stability Act.

A national assembly, which took place on 5 April, was attended by ten of the eleven campuses, the University High School, the Conservatory of Music of Puerto Rico, and the Escuela de Artes Plásticas y Diseño de Puerto Rico. They voted in favor of an indefinite system-wide strike, which began on 6 April. However, the system-wide strike affected eight of the eleven campuses immediately, as three campuses attending the assembly had not reached the required number of attendants for their votes to be counted. Despite this, each of these campuses held individual assemblies which saw them vote in favor of going on strike, both indefinitely and definitely.

On May 5, the Bayamon campus voted to end the strike leaving only the Río Piedras and Humacao campuses on strike. On June 5, Río Piedras voted to end their strike. The strike officially ended on June 7, 2017, when the last remaining campus still on strike, Humacao, voted during an assembly to end their shutdown.

== See also ==
- 2010–2011 University of Puerto Rico strikes
