= List of universities and colleges in Ponce, Puerto Rico =

This is a list of colleges and universities in Ponce, Puerto Rico. Both, public and private colleges and universities are listed. General as well as specialized institutions of higher education are included.

== List ==
The following table lists colleges and universities by their name. A listing sorted by any of the other fields can be obtained by clicking on the header of the field. For example, clicking on "Barrio" will sort colleges and universities by their barrio location.

No.	Name	Photo	Barrio	Location	Type	Affiliation	Year Opened	Enrollment (Year)
1	Caribbean University		Bucaná	PR-1, Ave. La Ceiba	Private	For profit	1986	755 (2019)
2	Northbridge University (Note: Formerly Ponce Paramedical College; formerly National University College.)		Coto Laurel	PR-506 and PR-52	Private	For profit	1983 (Note: Refers to the main campus in Bayamon. Opening date for the Ponce campus is not known)	2,607 (2016) (Note: According to "communitycollegereview.com", at the time of its merger with National University College in 2016, the Ponce Paramedical College had an enrollment of 2,607 students in its Ponce campus (1213 Acacia Street, Urbanizacion Villa Flores, Ponce).)
3	Northbridge University - Technical School (Note: Formerly, Instituto de Banca y Comercio en Ponce.)		Primero	C. Ferrcarril at Esquina Concordia	Private	For profit	1983	Unk
4	Ponce Health Sciences University		Playa	Ponce Bypass	Private	For profit	1977	1,000+ (2019)
5	Pontificia Universidad Católica de Puerto Rico		Canas Urbano	Avenida Las Américas	Private	Roman Catholic	1948	12,000 (2011)
6	Pontifical Catholic University of Puerto Rico School of Architecture		Tercero	C. Marina at Plaza Las Delicias	Private	Roman Catholic	2009	289 (2019)
7	Pontifical Catholic University of Puerto Rico School of Law		Canas Urbano	Avenida Las Américas	Private	Roman Catholic	1961	501 (2023)
8	Universidad Ana G. Méndez (Note: Formerly, Universidad del Turabo en Ponce)		Machuelo Abajo	PR-14 EB, Avenida Tito Castro	Private	For profit	2005	Unk
9	Universidad de Puerto Rico		Playa	Ponce Bypass and PR-12	Public	Commonwealth of Puerto Rico	1970	3,120 (2014)
10	Universidad Interamericana de Puerto Rico		Sabanetas	PR-1 WB, Mercedita sector	Private	Christian Church	1962	5,000 (2019)

Key:
C. = Calle (street)
NB = Northbound
SB = Southbound
WB = Westbound
EB = Eastbound
Unk = Unknown
N/A = Not applicable

== See also ==
- List of colleges and universities in Puerto Rico
