= Vassallo =

Vassallo or Vasallo is a surname of Italian and Spanish origin. It is a common surname in Malta. Notable people with the surname include:

- Andrea Vassallo (architect)
- Andrea Vassallo (footballer) (born 1997), Italian footballer
- Ángel Daniel Vassallo (born 1986), Puerto Rican basketball player
- Angelo Vassallo (1953–2010), Italian politician
- Antonio Maria Vassallo (c. 1620–1664/1673), Italian Baroque painter
- Barrie Vassallo (born 1956), Welsh footballer
- Francisco Vassallo (1789–1849), Puerto Rican mayor
- Ġan Anton Vassallo (1817–1868) Maltese writer, poet and academic
- Gustavo Vassallo (born 1978), Peruvian footballer
- Gustavo Vassallo (fencer) (1920–2012), Argentine fencer
- Harry Vassallo, Maltese politician
- Italo Vassallo (1940–2021), Italian-Eritrean footballer
- Jesse Vassallo (born 1961), Puerto Rican swimmer
- Joseph Vassallo (born 1964), American actor
- Luciano Vassallo (1935–2022), footballer of Eritrean and Italian origin
- Martín Vassallo Argüello (born 1980), Argentine tennis player
- Mary Grech (née Vassallo; 1937–2026), Maltese television presenter and actress
- Nicla Vassallo (born 1963), Italian philosopher and writer
- Salvador Vassallo (businessman) (1942–2007), Puerto Rican businessman
- Salvador Vassallo (swimmer) (born 1968), Puerto Rican swimmer
- Víctor Vassallo (born 1960), Puerto Rican businessman, athlete, and politician
- Willie Vassallo (1949–2025), Maltese footballer
- Industrias Vassallo, Puerto Rican manufacturing company
