= List of colleges and universities in Puerto Rico =

This list of universities and colleges in Puerto Rico includes colleges and universities in Puerto Rico that grant bachelor's degrees and/or post-graduate master's and doctorate degrees. The list does not include community colleges (alternatively called junior colleges) that grant two-year associate's degrees.

== List of colleges ==
- Adventist University of the Antilles
- Albizu University
- Atenas University
- Ana G. Méndez University (UAGM)
  - UAGM at Aguadilla
  - UAGM at Barceloneta
  - UAGM at Bayamón
  - UAGM at Cabo Rojo
  - UAGM at Carolina (Main campus)
  - UAGM at Cupey (Main campus)
  - UAGM at Cayey
  - UAGM at Gurabo (Main campus)
  - UAGM at Ponce
  - UAGM at Santa Isabel
  - UAGM at Yabucoa
- Atlantic University
- Caribbean University (CU)
  - CU at Bayamón (Main campus)
  - CU at Carolina
  - CU at Ponce
  - CU at Vega Baja
- «Centro de Estudios Multidisciplinarios» CEM College
  - CEM at Humacao
  - CEM at San Juan
- Center for Advanced Studies on Puerto Rico and the Caribbean
- Colegio de Cinematografía Artes y Television
- Colegio Universitario de San Juan
- Conservatory of Music of Puerto Rico
- Dewey University (Dewey U)
  - Dewey U at Carolina
  - Dewey U at Hato Rey
  - Dewey U at Juana Díaz
  - Dewey U at Manatí
- «Educación, Desarrollo y Progreso» EDP University
  - EDP at Caguas
  - EDP at Hato Rey (Main campus)
  - EDP at Humacao
  - EDP at Manatí
  - EDP at San Sebastián
  - EDP at Villalba
- Escuela de Artes Plásticas y Diseño de Puerto Rico
- Evangelical Seminary of Puerto Rico
- Huertas College
- Humacao Community College
- Instituto Comercial de Puerto Rico Junior College (ICPR)
  - ICPR at Arecibo
  - ICPR at Hato Rey
  - ICPR at Manatí
  - ICPR at Mayaguez
- Instituto Tecnologico de Puerto Rico (ITPR)
  - ITPR at Guayama
  - ITPR at Manatí
  - ITPR at San Juan
- Interamerican University of Puerto Rico (Inter)
  - Inter at Aguadilla
  - Inter at Arecibo
  - Inter at Barranquitas
  - Inter at Bayamón
  - Inter at Fajardo
  - Inter at Guayama
  - Inter at Ponce
  - Inter at San Germán (Main campus)
  - Inter Metropolitan Campus
  - Inter School of Aviation
  - Inter School of Law
  - Inter School of Optometry
- Mech-Tech College
- Mizpa Pentecostal University
- Northbridge University (NU, formerly NUC)
  - NU at Arecibo
  - NU at Bayamón (Main campus)
  - NU at Caguas
  - NU at Mayagüez
  - NU at Ponce
  - NU at Río Grande
  - NU – Technical School (NU-IBC)
    - NU-IBC at Arecibo
    - NU-IBC at Bayamón
    - NU-IBC at Caguas
    - NU-IBC at Cayey
    - NU-IBC at Carolina
    - NU-IBC at Fajardo [currently Teach-Out Status]
    - NU-IBC at Guayama
    - NU-IBC at Humacao
    - NU-IBC at Manatí
    - NU-IBC at Mayagüez
    - NU-IBC at Moca [currently Teach-Out Status]
    - NU-IBC at Ponce
    - NU-IBC at San Juan (Main Campus)
  - NU – Columbia Central (NU-CCU)
    - NU-CCU at Bayamón
    - NU-CCU at Caguas (Main campus)
    - NU-CCU at Carolina [currently Teach-Out Status]
    - NU-CCU at Yauco [currently Teach-Out Status]
- Polytechnic University of Puerto Rico
- Ponce Health Sciences University
- Pontifical Catholic University of Puerto Rico (PUCPR)
  - PUCPR at Arecibo
  - PUCPR at Mayagüez
  - PUCPR at Ponce (Main campus)
  - PUCPR School of Architecture
  - PUCPR School of Law
  - PUCPR School of Theology
  - Bayamón Central University
- San Juan Bautista School of Medicine
- Theological University of the Caribbean
- Universal Technology College of Puerto Rico
- Universidad Adventista de las Antillas
- University of Puerto Rico (UPR) System
  - UPR at Aguadilla
  - UPR at Arecibo
  - UPR at Bayamón
  - UPR at Carolina
  - UPR at Cayey
  - UPR at Humacao
  - UPR at Mayagüez
  - UPR at Ponce
  - UPR at Río Piedras (Main campus)
  - UPR at Utuado
  - UPR Medical Sciences Campus
- University of the Sacred Heart
- Universidad Central del Caribe

== Defunct colleges ==
- Columbia Central University (now Northbridge University - Columbia Central)
- Instituto de Banca y Comercio (now Northbridge University – Technical School)
- «Centro de Estudios Multidisciplinarios» CEM College
  - CEM at Bayamón campus (2023)
  - CEM at Mayagüez campus (2023)
- Pontifical Catholic University of Puerto Rico (PUCPR)
  - PUCPR at Guayama campus (2000)

== See also ==
- List of college athletic programs in Puerto Rico
- List of universities and colleges in Bayamón, Puerto Rico
- List of universities and colleges in Ponce, Puerto Rico
