= Italian Puerto Ricans =

Puerto Rican citizens of Italian descent

Italo-portoricani (Italian) Ítalo-puertorriqueños (Spanish)
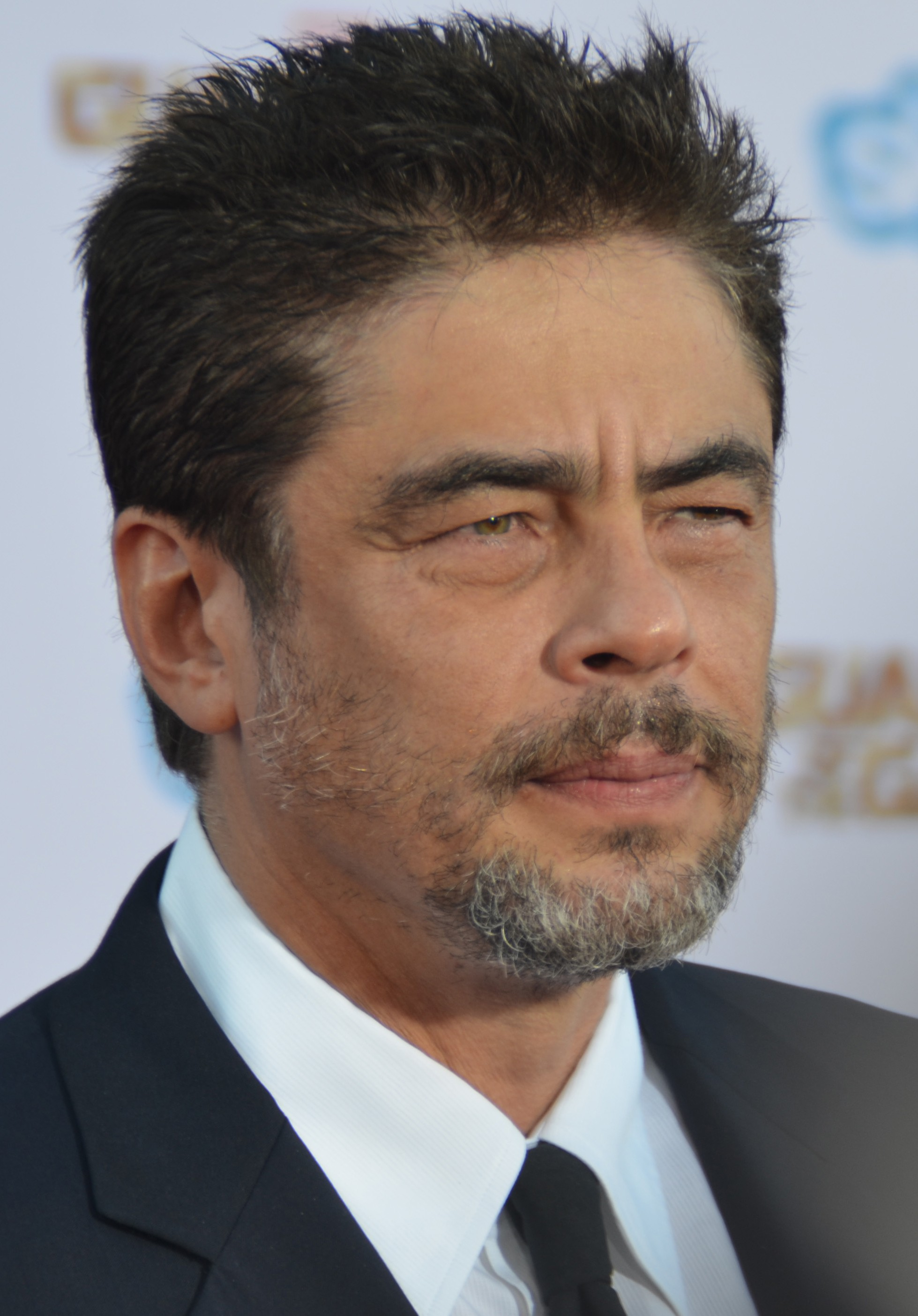
- Benicio del Toro has partly Italian ancestry

Total population
- c. 350 (by birth) c. 10,000 (by ancestry)

Regions with significant populations
- Ponce and San Juan

Languages
- Puerto Rican Spanish · Italian and Italian dialects

Religion
- Roman Catholic

Related ethnic groups
- Italians, Italian Americans, Italian Argentines, Italian Bolivians, Italian Brazilians, Italian Canadians, Italian Chileans, Italian Colombians, Italian Costa Ricans, Italian Cubans, Italian Dominicans, Italian Ecuadorians, Italian Guatemalans, Italian Haitians, Italian Hondurans, Italian Mexicans, Italian Panamanians, Italian Paraguayans, Italian Peruvians, Italian Salvadorans, Italian Uruguayans, Italian Venezuelans

Italian Puerto Ricans (Italian: italo-portoricani; Spanish: ítalo-puertorriqueños) are Puerto Rican-born citizens who are fully or partially of Italian descent, whose ancestors were Italians who emigrated to Puerto Rico during the Italian diaspora, or Italian-born people in Puerto Rico.

== History ==
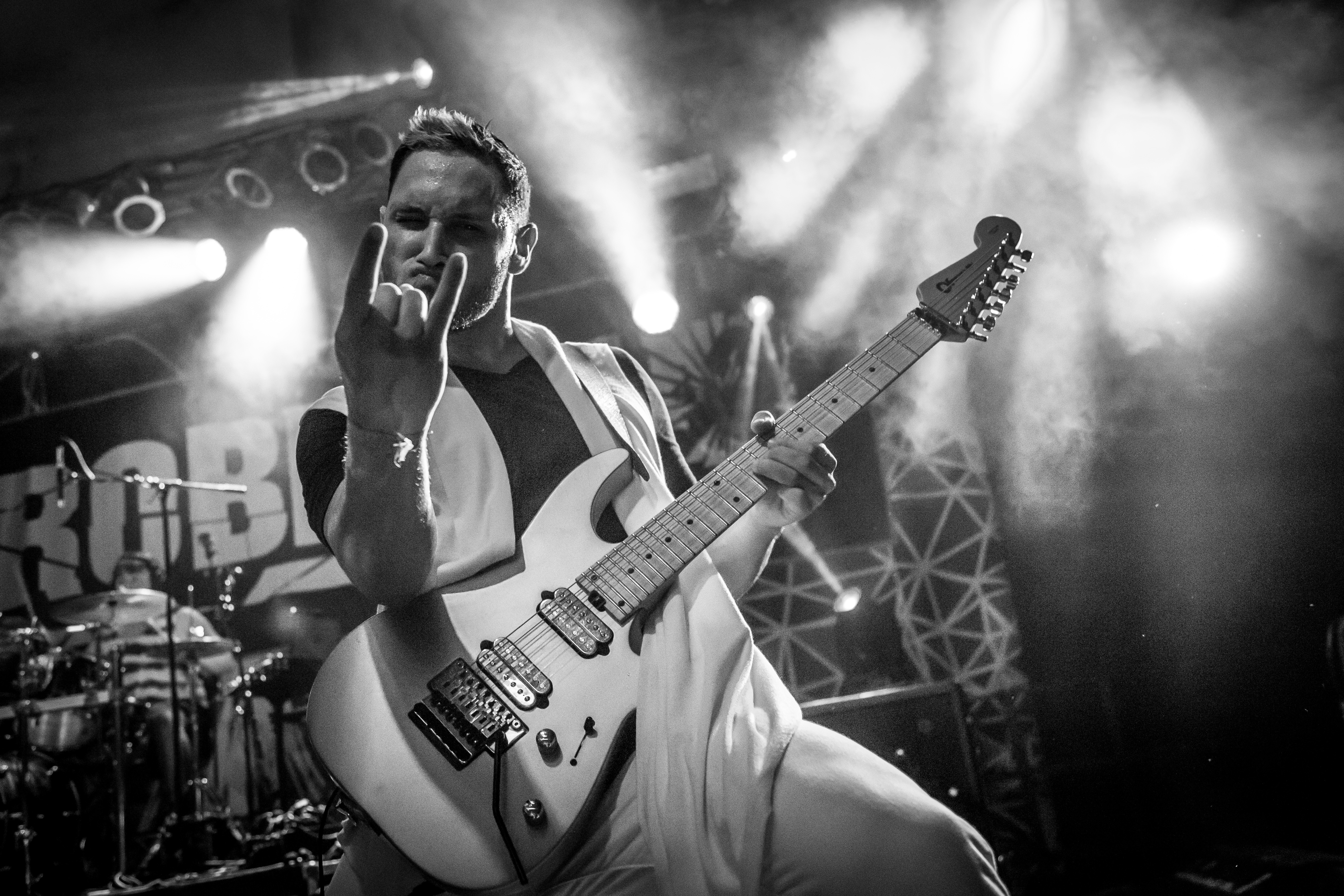
Angel Vivaldi

There are very few Italians who moved to live in Puerto Rico in the first centuries after the arrival of Christopher Columbus in 1492. Practically only a few dozen religious (with some adventurers and traders) formed the nucleus of this small Italian emigration until in the early 19th century.

From 1815, due to the Spanish Royal Decree of Grace, a few hundred Italians began to arrive in Puerto Rico. One of the places where they settled was Santa Isabel.

In fact, the Spanish crown issued this royal decree on 10 August 1815 with the intention of attracting European settlers to Puerto Rico and Cuba. The Spanish government, believing that the pro-independence Puerto Rican and Cuban would lose popularity, gave land concessions to Italian, German, French and Irish colonists in exchange for swearing allegiance to the Spanish government and obedience to the Catholic Church. After a period of five years, all received the so-called "Letter of Naturalization", which made them citizens of Spain and its colonial empire.

Consequently, according to the academic Pedro Hernandez, 110 Italians emigrated between 1815 and 1820, and another 129 emigrated between 1820 and 1830, who settled mainly in Ponce and its surroundings. From these first Italian families came Salvador Vassallo, creator of the famous Industrias Vassallo of Ponce (internationally renowned and specialized in industrial plastic products).

In 2010, Puerto Ricans of Italian descent numbered around 10,000, while Italian citizens residing in Puerto Rico are 344, concentrated in Ponce and San Juan. In addition, there is also an Italian Honorary Consulate in San Juan.

== Notable Italian Puerto Ricans ==
- José Miguel Agrelot, comedian, radio and television host
- Cristian Arrieta, footballer
- Chucho Avellanet, singer and comedic actor
- Robert Avellanet, singer, songwriter, actor and music producer
- Giannina Braschi, poet, novelist, dramatist, and scholar
- Mara Croatto, actress
- Emmanuel D'Andrea, footballer
- Benicio del Toro, actor and producer
- Jenilca Giusti, singer, songwriter and actress
- Emilio Huyke, writer, boxing television broadcaster and sports enthusiast
- Gina Lynn, pornographic actress, model, and stripper
- Olga Elena Mattei, poet
- Luis Miguel, singer
- Catalina Morales, model, television personality, and beauty pageant titleholder
- Adán Nigaglioni Loyola, doctor and educator
- Benito Romano, attorney
- Alessandro Salvatore, footballer
- Alicia Tirelli, footballer
- Carla Tricoli, model, schoolteacher and actress
- Ed Trucco, actor, producer and former sportscaster
- Salvador Vassallo, businessman
- Claudia Vázquez, footballer
- Jose Vazquez-Cofresi, composer, percussionist and manager
- Angel Vivaldi, guitarist, songwriter and producer

== See also ==
- Italian diaspora

== Bibliography ==
- Baralt, Guillermo. Yauco, o las minas de oro cafetaleras. Talleres de Model. San Juan de Puerto Rico, 1985. (In Spanish)
- Favero, Luigi; Tassello, Graziano. Cent'anni di emigrazione italiana (1861 - 1961). CSER. Roma, 1981. (In Italian)
