= Vassalo =

Vassalo is a surname. Notable people with the surname include:

- Manuel António Vassalo e Silva (1899–1985), Portuguese military officer, administrator, and governor-general
- Maria Lúcia Vassalo Namorado (1909–2000), Portuguese writer, poet, journalist, teacher, and social reformer
- Salvador Vassalo (born 1993), Portuguese rugby union player

== See also ==
- Vassallo
- Vasallo
