= Salvador Vassallo =

Salvador Vassallo may refer to:

- Salvador Vassallo (businessman) (1942–2007), president and CEO of Vassallo Industries
- Salvador Vassallo (swimmer) (born 1968), Puerto Rican former swimmer
