= Puerto Rico Highway 506 =

Highway in Puerto Rico

Highway 506
- Ruta 506
- Carretera Doctor Humberto Zayas Chardón

Route information
- Maintained by Puerto Rico DTPW
- Length: 2.0 km (1.2 mi)

Major junctions
- South end: Urbanización Hacienda Juliana in Coto Laurel
- PR-52 in Coto Laurel
- North end: PR-14 in Coto Laurel

Location
- Country: United States
- Territory: Puerto Rico
- Municipalities: Ponce

Highway system
- Roads in Puerto Rico; List
← PR-505	→ PR-510
← PR-5156	PR-5506	→ PR-5510

Puerto Rico Highway 506 (PR-506) is a two-lane tertiary highway in the municipality of Ponce in Puerto Rico. The road runs north to south, joining PR-14, where PR-506 starts, to PR-52 interchange, where it ends. The road is located entirely within Barrio Coto Laurel and its length is 2.0 km (1.2 mi).

== Route description ==
In its short 2.0 km (1.2 mi) length, PR-506 is home to Hospital San Cristóbal, Bolera Caribe, National University College, a pharmacy, a branch of the United States Post Office, a bank, and many restaurants, among other businesses and few neighborhoods located in Barrio Coto Laurel. The southern end of PR-506 also provides access to Industrias Vassallo and Cristalia Premium Water industries.

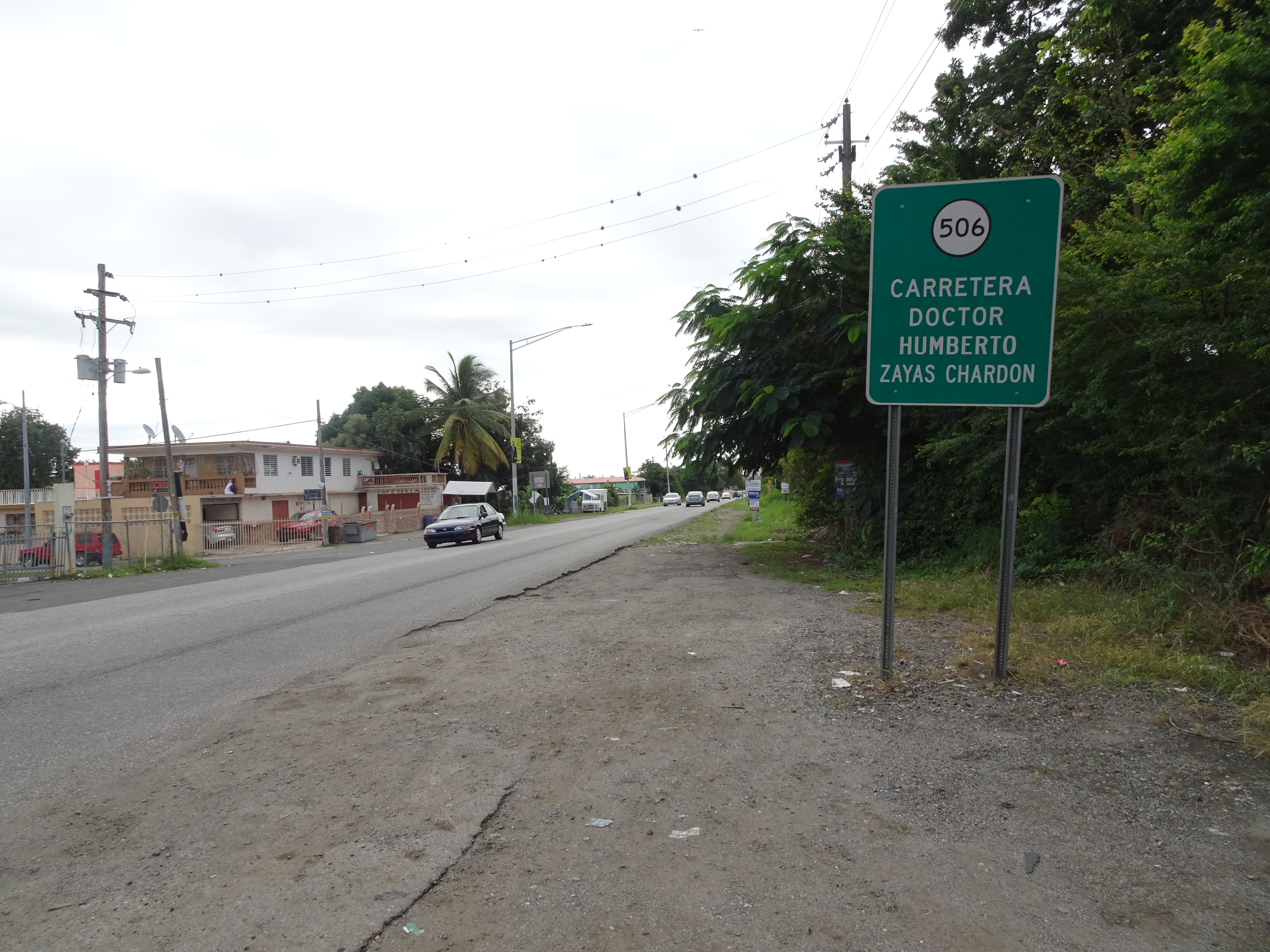
Puerto Rico Highway 506 is also called Carretera Dr. Humberto Zayas Chardón (Dr. Humberto Zayas Chardón Road)

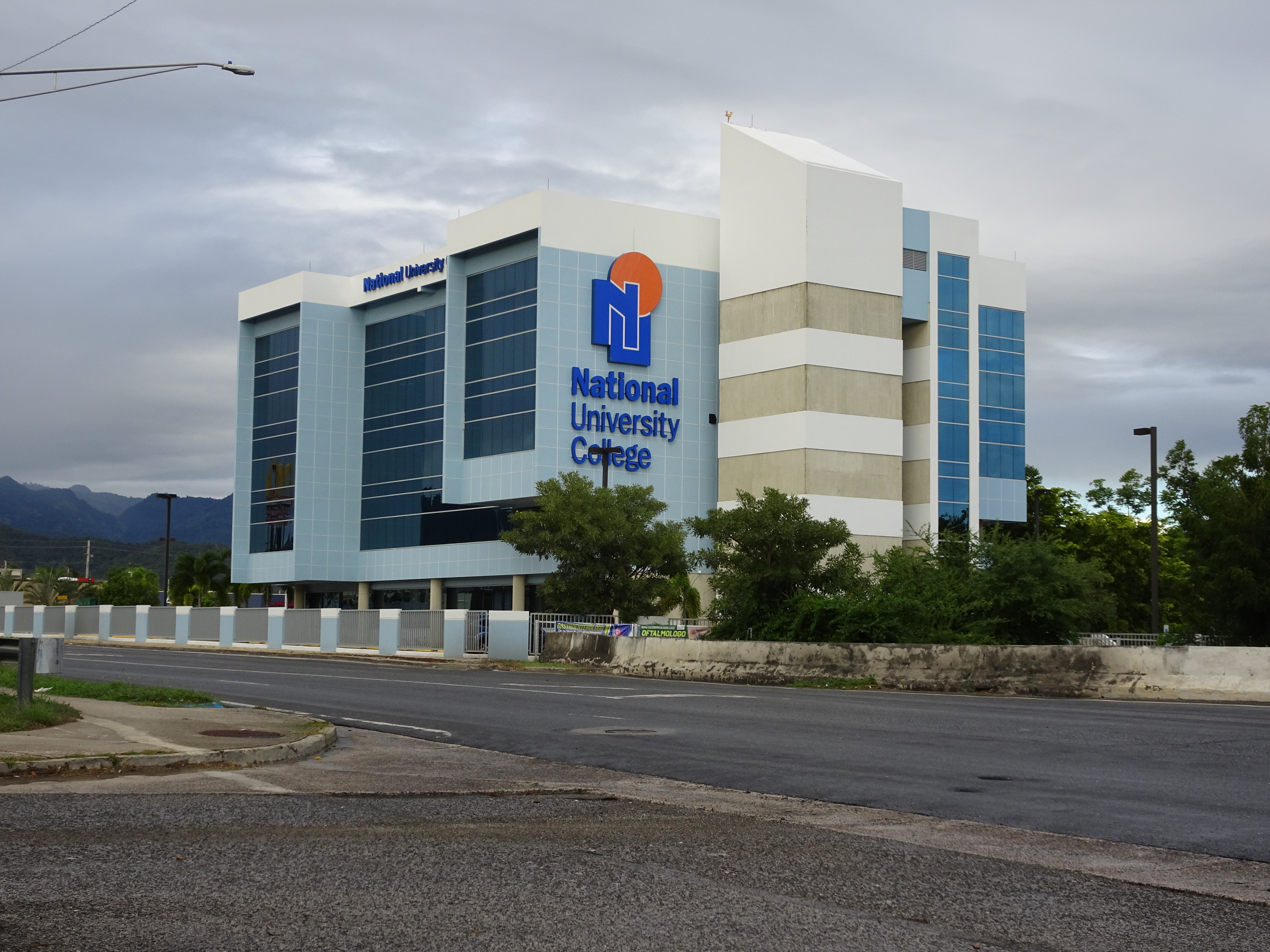
National University College seen from Puerto Rico Highway 506

== History ==
Until 2012 the road ran south to north starting at the easternmost edge of Mercedita International Airport at PR-1 and Camino Buyones, heading north and intersecting with PR-52 and continuing north to intersect with PR-14 where it ended. In that year, however, the Government of Puerto Rico abandoned maintenance of the stretch of the road from its PR-1 intersection to its intersection with PR-52, and the road was signed only from PR-52 to PR-14. At that time, the road was longer than its current 2.0 km (1.2 mi).

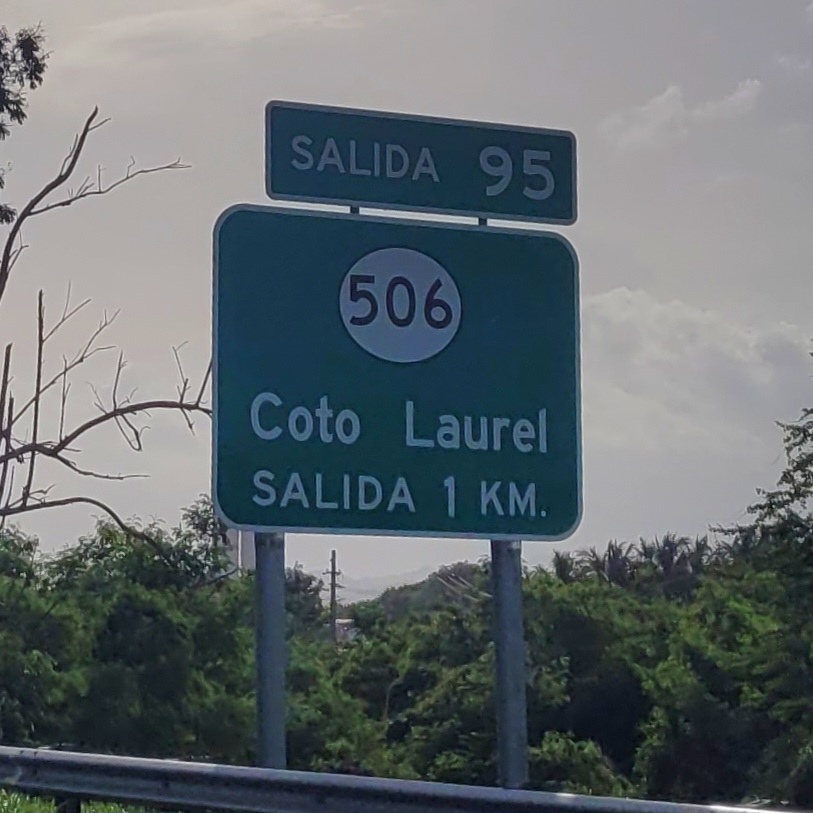
PR-52 south approaching exit 95 to PR-506 in Barrio Coto Laurel

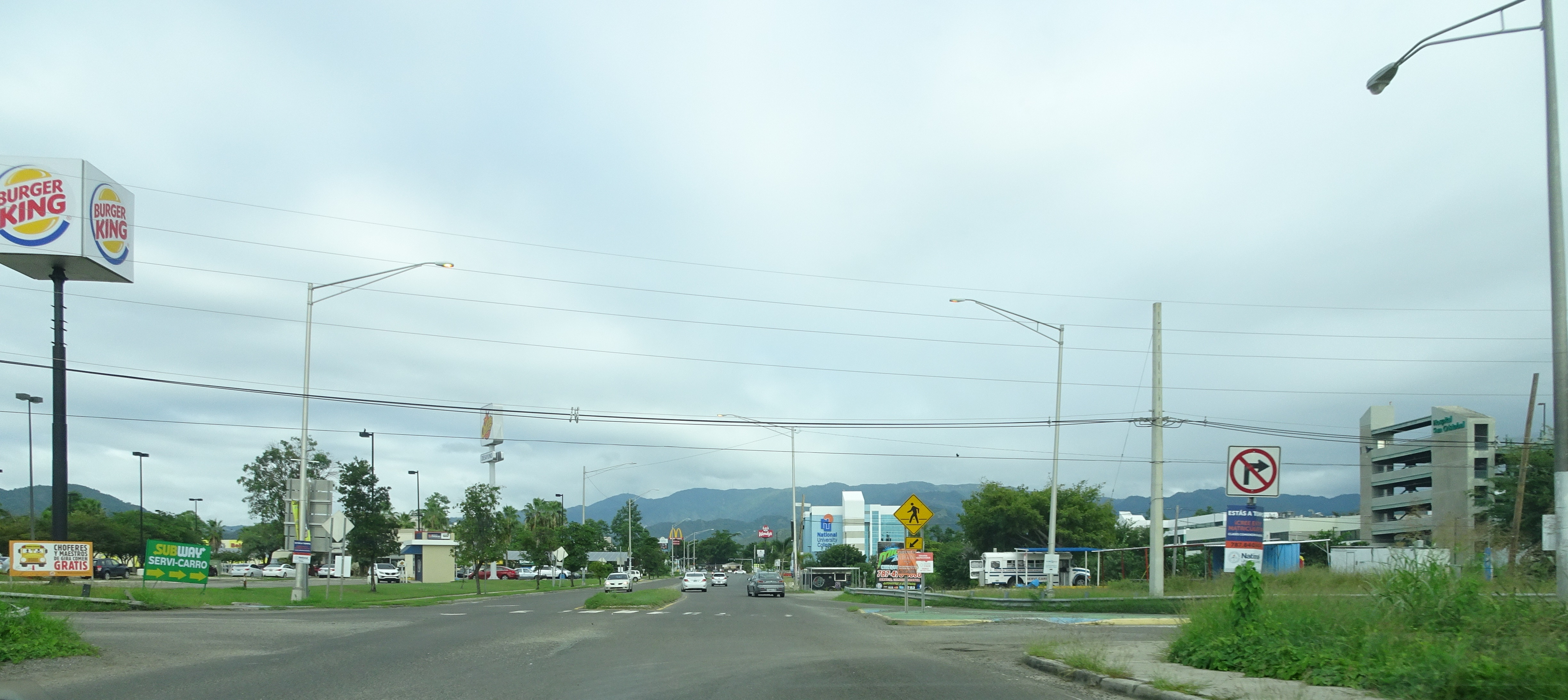
Puerto Rico Highway 506 heading north from Autopista Luis A. Ferré (PR-52)

== Major intersections ==
The entire route is located in Coto Laurel, Ponce.

km	mi	Destinations	Notes
2.0	1.2	Southern terminus of PR-506 at Urbanización Hacienda Juliana	
1.6– 1.5	0.99– 0.93	PR-52 – Ponce, San Juan	Diamond interchange; PR-52 (unsigned PRI-1) exit 95
0.0	0.0	PR-14 – Ponce, Juana Díaz	Northern terminus of PR-506; unsigned
1.000 mi = 1.609 km; 1.000 km = 0.621 mi

== Related route ==
Highway 5506
- Location: Ponce
- Length: 1.4 km (0.87 mi)

Puerto Rico Highway 5506 (PR-5506) is an important tributary of PR-506. This is a two-lane tertiary road which intersects with PR-1 and the southern terminus of PR-10, an important primary highway. The entire route is located in Ponce.

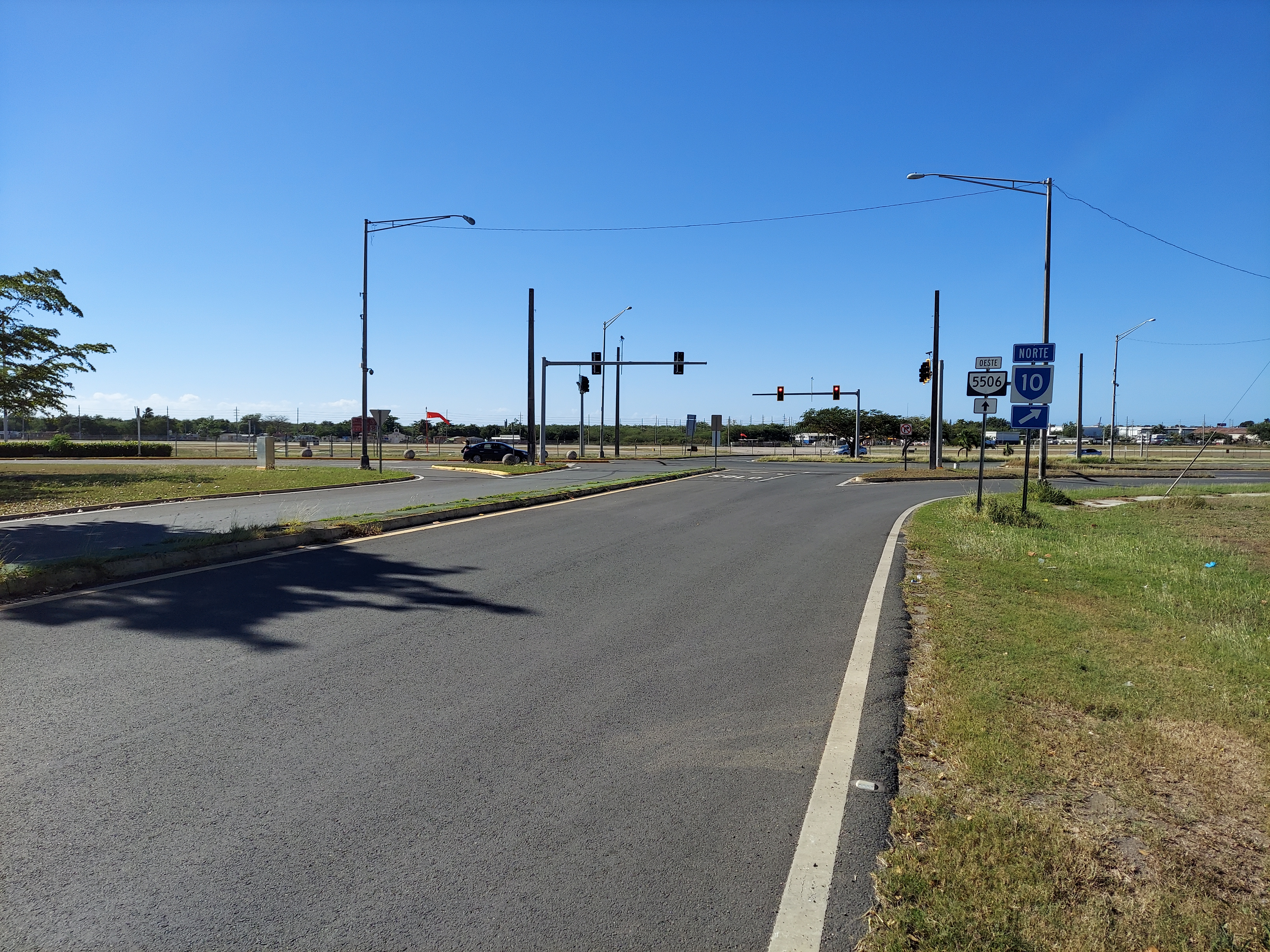
Counterclockwise terminus of PR-5506 in Barrio Sabanetas

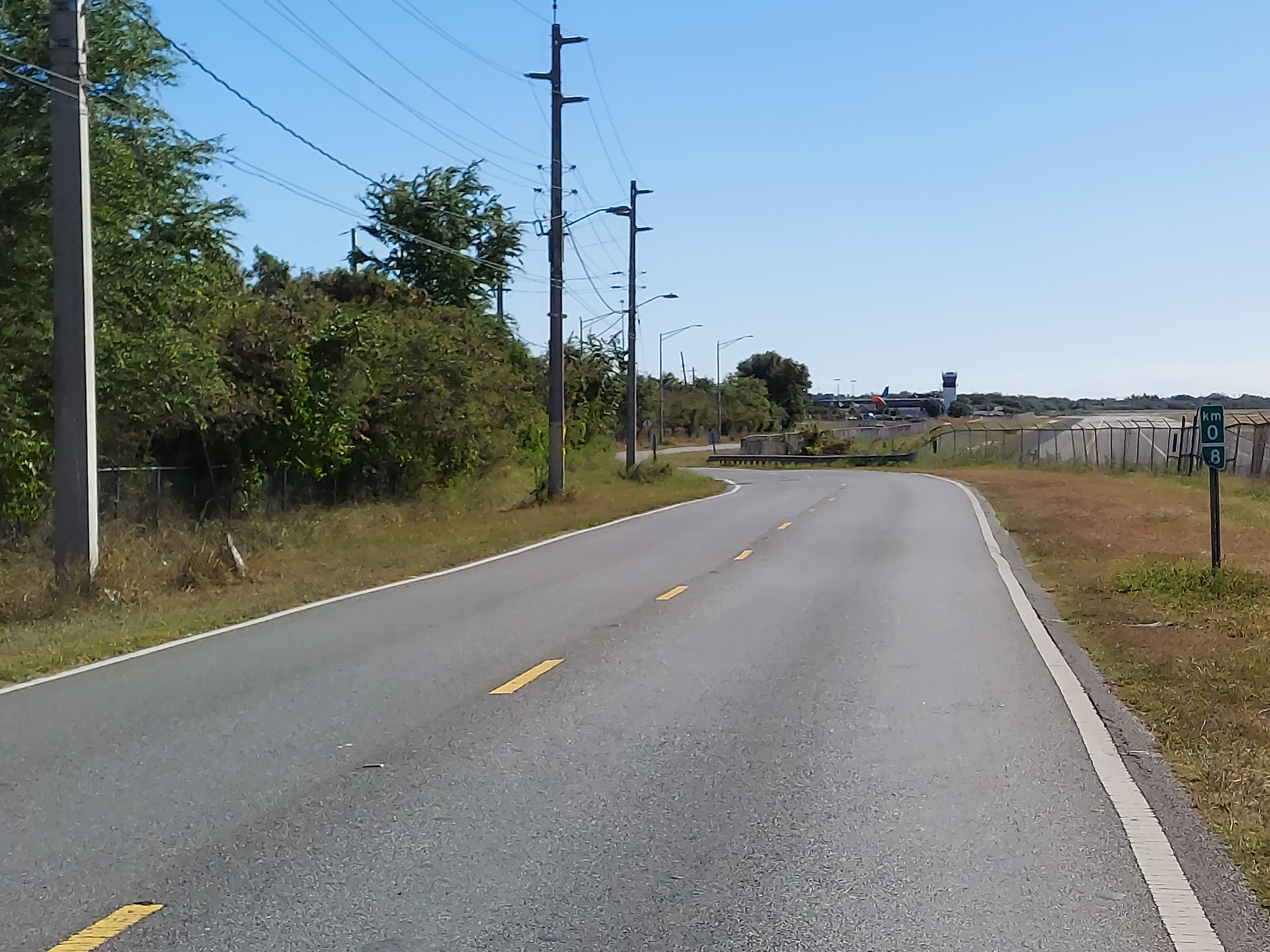
PR-5506 in Barrio Sabanetas

Location	km	mi	Destinations	Notes
Vayas–Sabanetas line	0.0	0.0	PR-1 – Santa Isabel, Ponce	Clockwise terminus of PR-5506
Vayas–Sabanetas line	1.4	0.87	PR-10 north (Carretera Salvador "Chiry" Vasallo Ruiz) – San Juan, Adjuntas	Counterclockwise terminus of PR-5506 and southern terminus of PR-10; PR-52 access is via PR-10; PR-52 exit 98B
Vayas–Sabanetas line	1.4	0.87	Aeropuerto Mercedita (Avenida Aeropuerto), Central Mercedita (Calle La Esperanza)	Counterclockwise terminus of PR-5506 and southern terminus of PR-10; PR-52 access is via PR-10; PR-52 exit 98B
1.000 mi = 1.609 km; 1.000 km = 0.621 mi

== See also ==
- List of highways in Ponce, Puerto Rico
