= Víctor Vassallo =

Puerto Rican businessman, athlete and politician

Víctor Vassallo Anadón

Member of the Puerto Rico House of Representatives from the 25th District
- In office January 2, 2009 – January 1, 2017
- Preceded by: Piro Reyes
- Succeeded by: Jacqueline Rodríguez Hernández

Personal details
- Born: October 11, 1960 (age 65) Ponce, Puerto Rico
- Party: Popular Democratic Party (PPD)
- Spouse: Ana Olmo
- Children: Gianina; Alexandra
- Education: Pontifical Catholic University of Puerto Rico (B.A.)
- Profession: Businessman, politician

Víctor Lorenzo Vassallo Anadón (born October 11, 1960) is a Puerto Rican businessman, athlete, and politician affiliated with the Popular Democratic Party (PPD). He has been a member of the Puerto Rico House of Representatives since 2009 representing District 25. Before that, Vassallo distinguished himself as a businessman within Vassallo, Inc., and as a swimmer.

== Early years and studies ==
Víctor Vassallo Anadón was born in Ponce on October 11, 1960, to Víctor "Chuchín" Vassallo and Daysi Anadón. He is the nephew of industrialist Salvador Vassallo. Víctor is the second of five sons. His brothers are Marcos, Jesse (b. 1961), Vicente, and Salvador (b. 1968). Víctor's father died in a car accident in Florida in 1977. Vassallo has a Bachelor's degree in Administration from the Pontifical Catholic University of Puerto Rico.

== Sports career ==
Encouraged by his father, Vassallo and his brothers enrolled in a swimming team since childhood. As a result, they distinguished themselves in the sport. In 1972, Víctor Vassallo, Sr. moved his family to Florida looking for better training facilities for his sons. Three years later, they moved to Mission Viejo, California, to be a part of the Mission Viejo Nadadores. In 1978, Víctor ranked first in the United States in 100 yards backstroke in Mission Viejo High School, California.

In 1979, Vassallo represented Puerto Rico in the Pan American Games. He received a scholarship of the University of Texas for his performance. During the 1983–84 Games of the Liga Atlética Interuniversitaria de Puerto Rico, Vassallo won 8 medals (6 gold, 2 silver) and set 2 records. Vassallo was also ranked among the 20 best backstroke swimmers worldwide by the Swimming World Magazine.

== Professional career ==
After retiring from swimming, Vassallo worked as Vice President of Sales and Operations of Vassallo, Inc. in Florida. The company was founded by his uncle.

Vassallo received the Ceiba Award from the Chamber of Commerce of Ponce because of his humanitarian and entrepreneurial vision.

== Political career ==
Vassallo was first elected to the House of Representatives of Puerto Rico at the 2008, representing District 25. He was reelected in 2012.

== Personal life ==
Vassallo is married to artist Ana Olmo. They have two daughters together: Gianina and Alexandra.
