= Florida Tech (disambiguation) =

Florida Tech refers to the Florida Institute of Technology in Melbourne, Florida. In the past it has also referred to

- Florida Technical College
- University of Central Florida, formerly called Florida Technological University

Florida Tech does not refer to Florida Polytechnic University (FPU or Florida Polytech). FPU refers to a new university created in 2012 in Florida.

- Florida Polytechnic University
