= Barrueta =

Barrueta is a Basque surname. Notable people with the surname include:

- Marilyn Barrueta (died 2010), American educator
- Noé Barrueta (born 1971), Mexican politician
- Norma Vasallo Barrueta, Cuban feminist researcher and academic
