= Bolera Caribe =

Bowling center Ponce, Puerto Rico

Coordinates: 18°02′18.41″N 66°32′57.68″W

- Type: Private
- Industry: Recreation
- Founded: 2004
- Headquarters: Barrio Coto Laurel, Ponce, Puerto Rico

Bolera Caribe is a bowling center located in barrio Coto Laurel in the municipality of Ponce, Puerto Rico, where bowling competitions for the 2010 Central American and Caribbean Games (CACG) were held. The venue is located at the intersection of PR-506 and PR-52. The Center is owned by Bolera Caribe, Inc., a private company. The bowling center was inaugurated in November 2004.

== History ==
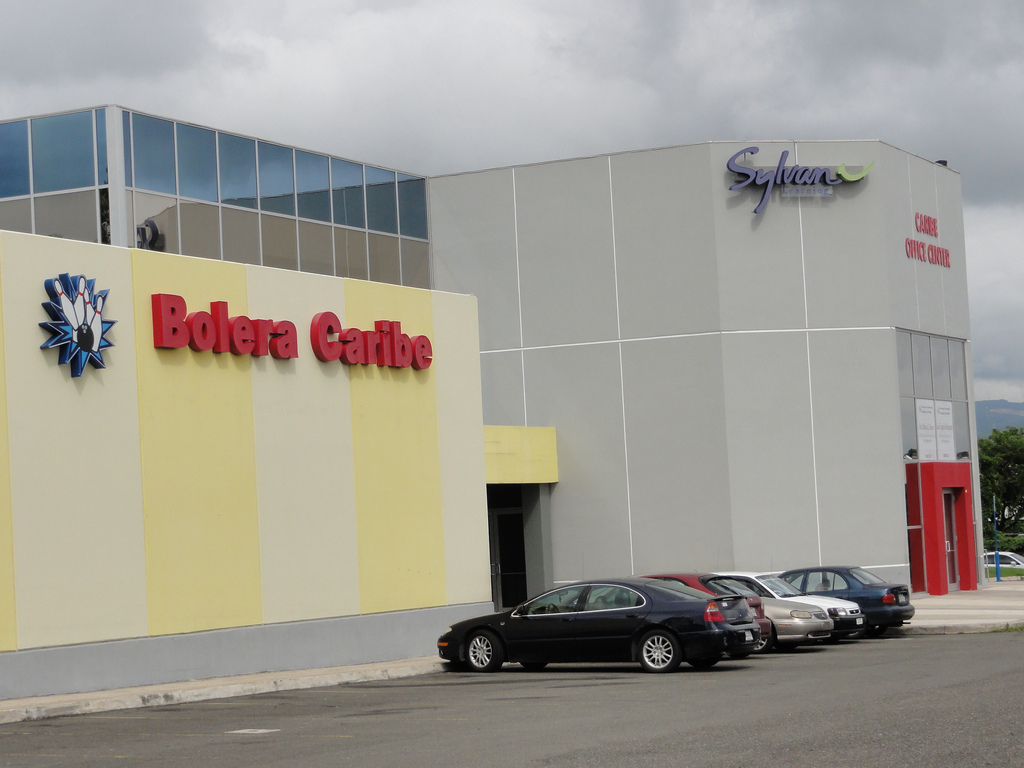
Bolera Caribe in 2010

The Bolera de Ponce, as Bolera Caribe was previously called, was inaugurated in Ponce in the mid 1950s in the Mariani sector of barrio Primero of Ponce. As the 1990s progressed, the neighborhood where the Bolera was located showed signs of aging and began to decay. This was a problem for the company, as it was inconsistent with the image it wanted to portray and the type of clientele it was seeking to continue attracting.

Due to overcrowding in the area, parking also became a problem for the Bolera. Thus, as overflow, guests made use of the parking area of a shopping plaza across the street from the Bolera. However, this resulted in several breakins that gave the Bolera a bad reputation as an entertainment destination. To solve the problem, the company attempted to sell the building and move elsewhere, but no buyer could be found. The business continued to lose revenue for several years. And a result the bowling alley opted for closing down while seeking another location. It closed down in the late 1990s, leaving the old building vacant.

== New building and location ==
In 2007, the company found a suitable location for its new bowling center at the intersection of routes PR-506 and PR-52, which provided easy access to Ponce and towns nearby, thus providing it greater exposure as well. Given its new location the Bolera shed its Ponce-only roots and became more of a regional entertainment venue. In light of this, its name was also changed from Bolera de Ponce to Bolera Caribe, thus reflecting its newly expanded business territory. Caribe means Caribbean in Spanish. This name change was appropriate because not only the city of Ponce but all of its neighboring towns are on the shores of the Caribbean. The new bowling center was part of Mayor Churumba's plan for providing an entertainment venue in that part of the municipality. The venue is currently the only bowling center in the entire Caribbean coast of Puerto Rico.

== Building ==
The new Bolera Caribe was designed by CMA Architects & Engineers LLP, the same Puerto Rican architectural firm that built the Center for Molecular and Comparative Medicine at the Ponce School of Medicine, the 16-story Torre Chardón office tower in San Juan's Plaza Las Américas, and the underground Urban Train Río Piedras University Station. The building consists of 2500 square meters of space.

== Facilities ==
The facility includes:

- Twenty-four synthetic lanes with Brunswick GSX equipment
- Tournament space for up to 300 spectators
- Billiard room
- Game room
- Cafeteria
- Private conference room with capacity for 25
- A restaurant called Café Caribe Restaurant-Bar & Grill

== Economics ==
The facility was built at a cost of US$6 million. Current estimates show this company has an annual revenue of $130,000 and employs a staff of approximately two employees. The Bolera is the venue for the Ponce Bowling Club Bowling League, and other leagues.

== Central American and Caribbean Games ==
The bowling center was the venue of bowling competitions for the 21st Central American and Caribbean Games. The bowling venue is in regulatory compliance with the World Tenpin Bowling Association (WTBA) standards, which helped get it approved as "the official stage for the upcoming bowling competitions of the XXI Central American and Caribbean Games to be held in Mayagüez, Puerto Rico in July 2010." The Games were celebrated from July 17 to August 1, 2010, in the city of Mayagüez, and the schedule of events showed when Games were played at the Bolera . The bowling center has a capacity of 300 Game espectators. The facilities were offered to the CACG Organizing Committee by the Mayor of Ponce, María Meléndez, in April 2010: "The events of canoeing, rowing, and bowling will take place in the Ciudad Señorial, this last one at Bolera Caribe."

== See also ==
- Caribbean Cinemas
