= Vasallo =

Vasallo or Vassallo is a surname of Spanish and Italian origin. Notable people with the surname include:

- Aldenay Vasallo (born 1977), Cuban hammer thrower
- Brigitte Vasallo (born 1973), Spanish writer
- Carlos Vasallo (born 1950), Spanish businessman and audiovisual producer
- Nicholas Vasallo (born 1979), American composer
- Norma Vasallo Barrueta, sometimes known as Norma Vasallo, Cuban feminist researcher and academic

== See also ==
- Palacio Vasallo, government building in Argentina
- VasalloVision, Spanish-language television network in the US.
