= Jesse Vassallo =

Puerto Rican olympic swimmer (born 1961)

Personal information
- Full name: Jesús David Vassallo Anadón
- Nickname: "Jesse"
- National team: United States; Puerto Rico
- Born: August 9, 1961 (age 64) Ponce, Puerto Rico
- Height: 5 ft 9 in (1.75 m)
- Weight: 170 lb (77 kg)

Sport
- Sport: Swimming
- Strokes: Backstroke, individual medley
- Club: Mission Viejo Nadadores
- College team: University of Miami
- Coach: Bill Diaz; U. of Miami; Mark Schubert; Mission Viejo Nadadores
Medal record
Men's swimming
Representing the United States
World Championships (LC)
Gold medal – first place	1978 Berlin	200 m backstroke
Gold medal – first place	1978 Berlin	400 m medley
Silver medal – second place	1978 Berlin	200 m medley
Pan American Games
Gold medal – first place	1979 San Juan	200 m medley
Gold medal – first place	1979 San Juan	400 m medley
Silver medal – second place	1979 San Juan	200 m backstroke

Jesús David "Jesse" Vassallo Anadón (born August 9, 1961) is a former competition swimmer and world record-holder in the 200 and 400 individual medley, who participated in the 1984 Summer Olympics for the United States. In 1997, he became the first Puerto Rican to be inducted into the International Swimming Hall of Fame. He was somewhat unique in the scale of his achievements as a swimmer, and in a tribute to his World Records in 1978 was voted Swimming World Magazine's "Male Swimmer of the Year". From 2004 to 2009, he served as the president of the Puerto Rican National Swimming Federation (Federación Puertorriqueña de Natación).

== Early years ==
Vassallo Anadón is the third child of five siblings, born in Ponce, Puerto Rico, to the Vassallo Anadón family. He received his primary education at Academia Cristo Rey in Ponce. His sports-minded father, Victor Vassallo, who at one time played professional basketball, was the brother of the late Puerto Rican industrialist Salvador Vassallo, and encouraged his children to participate in sports. Vassallo Anadón's brothers are Marcos, swimmer, businessman, and politician Víctor (b. 1960), Vicente, and swimmer Salvador (b. 1968).

On one occasion, while relaxing by a hotel swimming pool in San Juan, Puerto Rico, Vassallo's father asked his sons to compete against some girls that were swimming laps in the pool. The father was impressed with what he saw, and as soon as he returned to Ponce he enrolled them in a local swimming team.

In 1971, at the age of 10, Vassallo's father moved his family to Miami, Florida, where he was to open a branch of the family business, Vassallo Industries. Jesse began swimming with the Miami Hurricanes, an age-group team, under gifted coach Bill Diaz, who also coached the University of Miami swim team, where Vassallo would later have an exceptional college swimming career.

== Swimming competitions ==
Jesse took his first national record at age 13 in the 200m backstroke, and later broke a 50-meter backstroke swimming record. In 1975, he won his first gold medal in backstroke at the Medley Relay, held in Colombia. Vassallo held various records, including the 100- and 200-meter backstrokes, and the 200- and 400-meter individual medley. Vassallo already ranked among the top ten in the world in three of the events.

== U.S. Swimming Team ==
Realizing his son's potential, Vassallo Anadón's father moved to Mission Viejo, California, where Vassallo completed his secondary studies. He began training with the Mission Viejo Nadadores under Hall of Fame Coach Mark Schubert, who would later become the coach of the USA Swimming Team, University of Texas Women, University of Southern California, and the American Olympic Team. In 1976, Vassallo Anadón wanted to participate in the 1976 Summer Olympics, which were held in Montreal, Canada, representing Puerto Rico, but he could not participate due to a ruling of the Puerto Rico Olympic Committee that stated that "in order to represent Puerto Rico, a person must have resided on the island for at least a year" (currently, this rule requires for a person to reside for three years before becoming a member of a Puerto Rican national sports team). He did however, participate in the U.S. Swimming Nationals at Philadelphia for the first time, and won his first national title and a national gold medal in the 1,500-meter freestyle.

In 1977, Vassallo Anadón traveled with the U.S. team, winning medals in New Zealand, the Netherlands and France. In 1978, Vassallo Anadón broke his first record in the 400-meter individual medley trials for the 1978 World Championships to be held in Berlin, Germany. In Berlin, he broke his record again and won two gold medals and a silver medal. In 1979, Vassallo Anadón broke his third world record in the 200-meter individual medley and won gold in the 1979 Pan American Games, held in San Juan. During the gold medal ceremony, Vassallo produced a small Puerto Rican flag which resulted in the entire crowd at the Escambron Aquatic Center singing the Puerto Rican national anthem "La Borinqueña". Vassallo Anadón's experiences in the 1979 Games were highlighted in the 1980 documentary A Step Away. Also in 1979, he graduated from high school and was placed in the list of the top ten athletes in the world, along with Muhammad Ali, Mario Andretti and others by Sports Illustrated magazine.

Vassallo Anadón was unable to attend the 1980 Summer Olympics held in Moscow, Russia, because of the U.S. and multinational boycott imposed by U.S. President Jimmy Carter as a response to the Soviet invasion of Afghanistan. He competed in another competition held in the United States, which were held at the same time as the Moscow Olympics. Vassallo made better times in the 200- and 400-meter individual medley event at the competition than the two gold medalists in Moscow.

== Retirement from competition swimming and college years ==
After competing around the world, Vassallo Anadón moved to Miami and enrolled in the University of Miami. In 1981, he was the NCAA champion in the 400-meter individual medley and set school records in the 200-meter individual medley and the 400-meter individual medley. During his stay at University of Miami, Vassallo Anadón was a two-time All-American in 1981 and 1982, was selected for the Pan American team, as well as the 1980 U.S. Olympic team, which did not compete in Moscow. A June 1982 knee injury to his left knee ligaments that required surgery, however, practically ended his swimming career. He made a successful comeback a year later, and was named to the 1984 U.S. Olympic team. At the 1984 Summer Olympics in Los Angeles, he finished fourth in the finals of the 400-meter individual medley, and also competed in the 200-meter backstroke.

He graduated from the University of Miami in 1985 with a Bachelor of Arts degree in communications. That same year he returned to Puerto Rico where he met his future wife, Betsy Lopez, sister of the Atlanta Braves baseball star Javy López and of Puerto Rican volleyball superstar Elaine Lopez. After working in his family business in Ponce for three years, Vassallo and his brothers opened "Vassallo Unlimited" which produces solid surface materials that are used in the construction industry.

Vassallo was inducted into the University of Miami Sports Hall of Fame in 1996.

Vassalo did some coaching after his competitive years and was the coach of the Pompano Piranhas Swim Club in 2020.

== Honors and legacy ==
In 1997, Vassallo Anadón became the first Puerto Rican to be inducted into the International Swimming Hall of Fame. Among other honors which have been bestowed upon him are his induction into the Japanese Swimmers Hall of Fame; the University of Miami's Hall of Fame; the Puerto Rican Hall of Fame and the Ponce Hall of Fame. Vassallo has also appeared on the covers of "The Olympian", "Sports Illustrated", and "Swimming World Magazine" among others. He is also recognized at Ponce's Park for the Illustrious Ponce Citizens. As of June 2011, Vassallo is Head Coach for the Pompano Beach Piranhas in Pompano Beach, Florida. Not surprisingly, after his World Records, he was Swimming World Magazine's "Male Swimmer of the Year" in 1978.

In Japan, the swimming style developed by Vassallo is called basaro (バサロ), based on a mispronunciation (va-sa-ro) of Vassallo's name.

In an interview for the Olympics Channel in 2018, Vassallo claims to have been a pioneer in the use of underwater dolphin kicks in backstroke events in 1976 when he was only 14 years old. The extensive use of this technique in the following decade completely transformed the sport.

== See also ==
- List of Puerto Ricans
- List of World Aquatics Championships medalists in swimming (men)
- Sports in Puerto Rico
- World record progression 200 metres individual medley
- World record progression 400 metres individual medley

Records
Preceded by Graham Smith	Men's 200-meter individual medley world record-holder (long course); August 24, 1978 – July 6, 1979	Succeeded by Bill Barrett
Preceded by Rod Strachan	Men's 400-meter individual medley world record-holder (long course); August 4, 1978 – August 8, 1982	Succeeded by Ricardo Prado
