= Instituto de Banca y Comercio =

Defunct vocational college in Puerto Rico

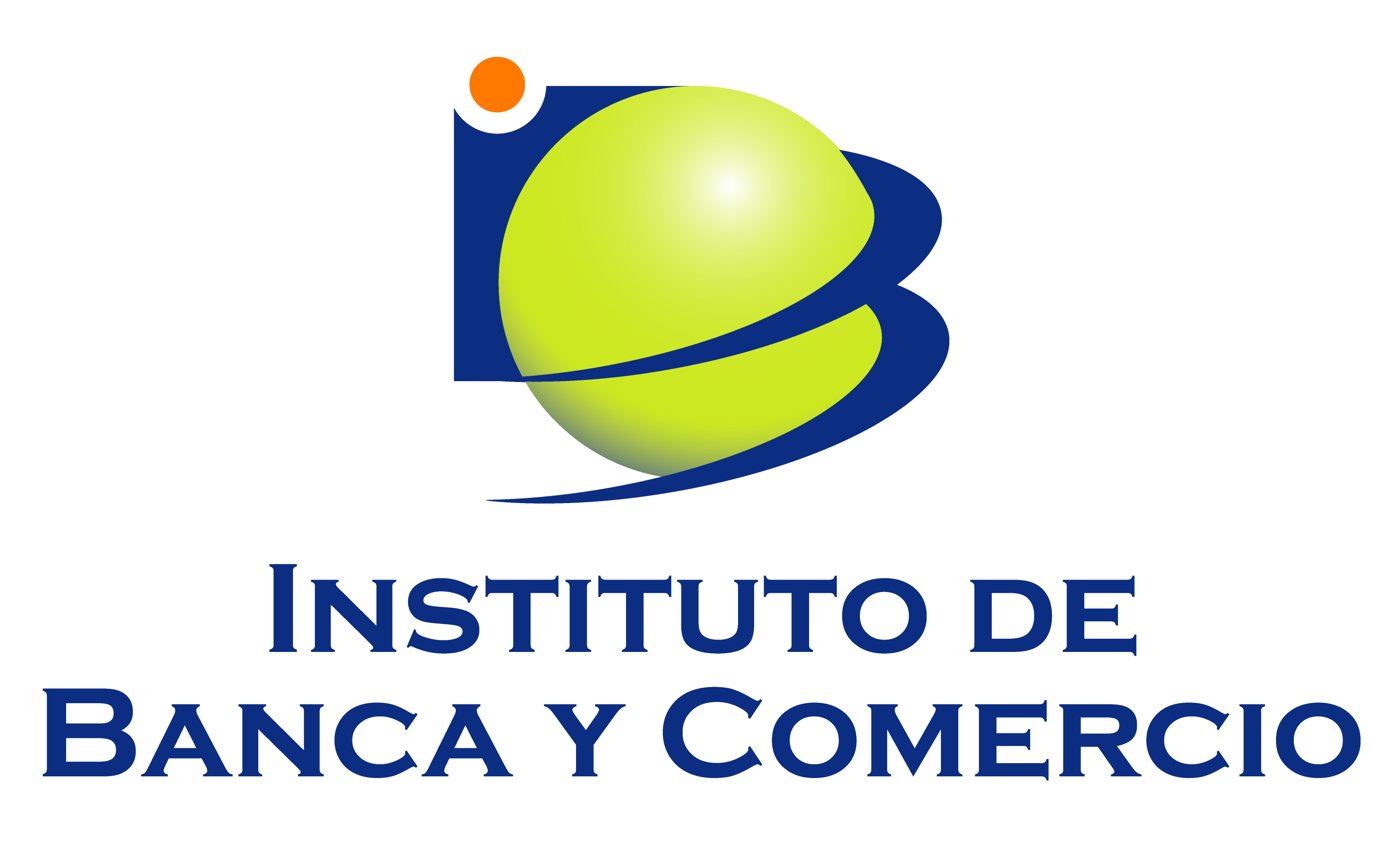
- Type: Private, For-Profit, Technical
- Active: 1974–2019
- President: Guillermo Nigaglioni
- Administrative staff: 1,600
- Students: 21,000
- Location: San Juan, Puerto Rico
- Campus: San Juan, Ponce, Mayagüez, Caguas, Manatí, Cayey, Fajardo, Guayama, Humacao, Carolina, Arecibo, Bayamón
- Website: www.ibanca.net

Instituto de Banca y Comercio (IBC) was a private, for-profit college-level institution with multiple locations in Puerto Rico. It offered short training programs and associate degrees. It merged with Northbridge University in 2019.

== History ==
Instituto de Banca y Comercio was founded by Fidel Alonso-Valls in 1974 in the city of San Juan, Puerto Rico, where it only had two classrooms and 15 students. Initially, it was an institution specialized in preparing tellers for the banking industry in Puerto Rico. Hence its original name, International Banking School.

Since then, it focused on training for careers that are in highest demand on the Island. It had 12 campuses and eight learning sites, over 21,000 students, and approximately 1,600 employees.

In March 2007, Instituto de Banca y Comercio was acquired by Leeds Equity Partners, an investment firm in New York. It was merged into Northbridge University, an independent proprietary university.

== Accreditation ==
Since 1978, Instituto de Banca y Comercio was accredited by the Accrediting Council for Independent Colleges and Schools (ACICS) to award diplomas. All of its programs were authorized by the Puerto Rico Council of Education. The campuses in San Juan (2006) and Ponce (2009) were authorized by the Puerto Rico Council of Education's Higher Education Division, and accredited by ACICS to award associate degrees. All the units were authorized by the U.S. Department of Education to participate in the Title IV programs of the Higher Education Act of 1965, as amended.

The school was also approved to accept students via Vocational Rehabilitation, Work Investment Act (WIA), Corrections Administration, and approved for the training of students under the various GI Bill programs.

== Locations ==
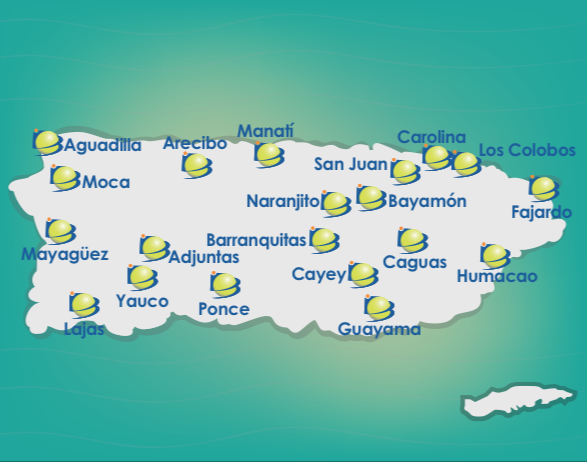
IBC locations' map

Campuses

- San Juan (1975) - its campus in Hato Rey in San Juan was slated to close in January, 2019.
- Ponce (1983)
- Mayagüez (1984)
- Cayey (1986)
- Guayama (1986)
- Manatí (1992)
- Fajardo (1991)
- Caguas (2000)
- Humacao (2008)
- Carolina (2009)
- Arecibo (2009)
- Bayamón (2010)

Learning Sites

- Adjuntas
- Aguadilla
- Barranquitas
- Lajas
- Los Colobos
- Moca
- Naranjito
- Yauco

== Ownership ==
Instituto de Banca y Comercio was a member of EduK Group, Inc. The group was initially organized in 2004 as the advisory entity for its member institutions. Founded and headquartered in Guaynabo, Puerto Rico, the member institutions included four colleges (Instituto de Banca y Comercio, National University College, Ponce Paramedical College, and Florida Technical College) and two specialized schools (Digital Animation and Visual Effects (DAVE) School and LaSalle Computer Learning Center).
