= Theological University of the Caribbean =

Evangelical Christian university in Puerto Rico

- Universidad Teológica del Caribe
- Former name: Colegio Biblico Pentecostal de Puerto Rico
- Dean: Jennifer Contreras
- Students: 381 (Fall 2022)
- Undergraduates: 281
- Address: Carretera 848, Km 0.5, Pablo Marquez Street, Barrio Saint Just, Trujillo Alto, 00976, Puerto Rico; 18.37423°N 66.010654°W
- Language: Spanish
- Website: www.utcpr.edu

Theological University of the Caribbean (Universidad Teológica del Caribe) formerly known as Biblical and Pentecostal College of Puerto Rico (Colegio Biblico Pentecostal de Puerto Rico) (CBPPR) is a private, Christian, Evangelical, Pentecostal, and coeducational university in Trujillo Alto, Puerto Rico that offers undergraduate and graduate studies in pastoral studies, biblical interpretation, Christian education, and theology. The university is accredited by the Caribbean Evangelical Theological Association (CETA) and The Association for Biblical Higher Education (ABHE).

In 2008, its name changed from Colegio Biblico Pentecostal de Puerto Rico to Universidad Teológica del Caribe, with the same contact address and phone number.
