= Coto Laurel =

Barrio of Ponce, Puerto Rico

- Barrio
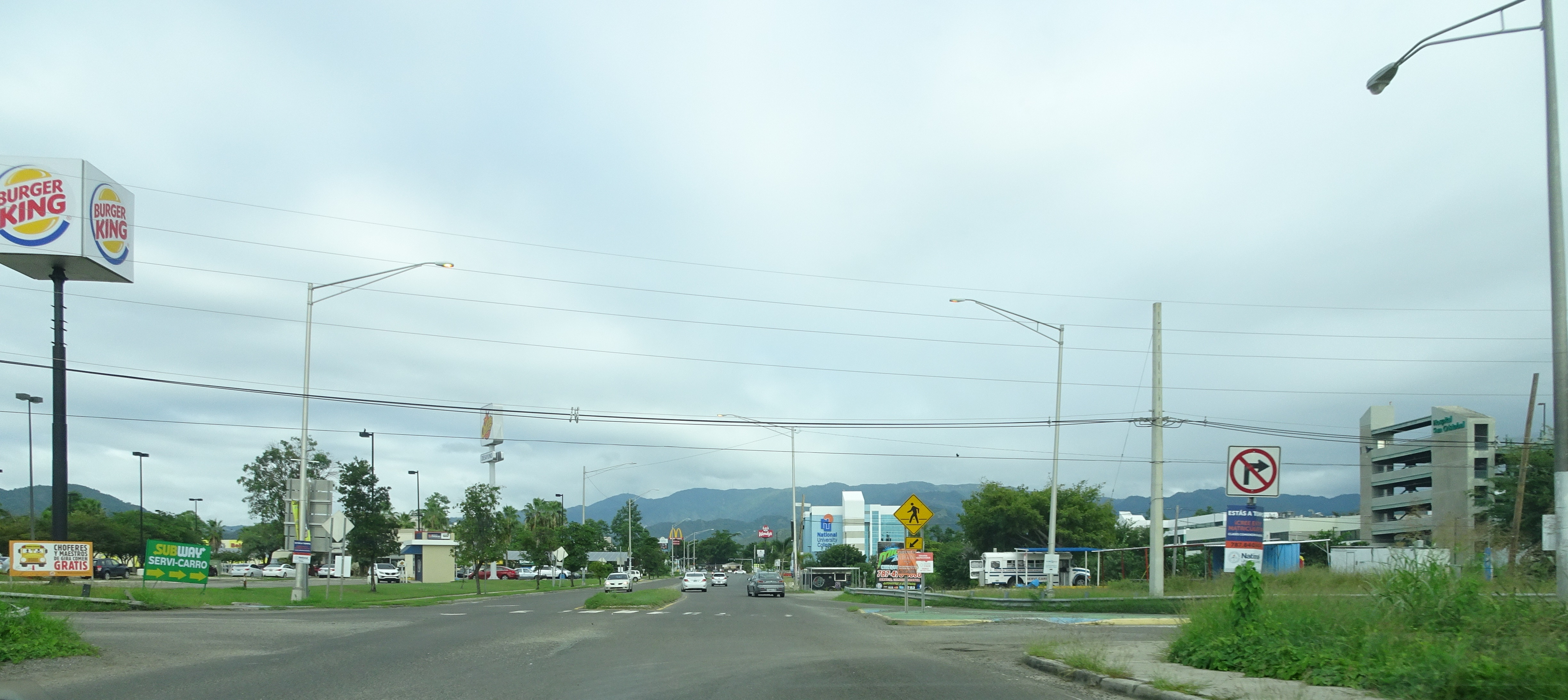
- Puerto Rico Highway 506 in Coto Laurel

- Location of barrio Coto Laurel within the municipality of Ponce shown in red

- Location of Puerto Rico
- Coordinates: 18°02′11″N 66°33′17″W
- Commonwealth: Puerto Rico
- Municipality: Ponce

Area
  - Total: 3.59 sq mi (9.3 km^{2})
  - Land: 3.54 sq mi (9.2 km^{2})
  - Water: 0.05 sq mi (0.13 km^{2})
- Elevation: 335 ft (102 m)

Population (2010)
  - Total: 7,123
  - Density: 2,023.6/sq mi (781.3/km^{2})
- Source: 2010 Census
- Time zone: UTC−4 (AST)

Coto Laurel (Barrio Coto Laurel) is one of the 31 barrios of the municipality of Ponce, Puerto Rico. Along with Anón, Marueño, Guaraguao, Quebrada Limon, Real, and San Patricio, and the coastal barrios of Canas and Capitanejo, Coto Laurel is one of the municipality's nine bordering barrios. It borders the municipality of Juana Diaz. It was founded in 1831.

== Location ==
Coto Laurel is a suburban barrio located in the southeastern section of the municipality, east of the traditional center of the city, Plaza Las Delicias. The toponymy, or origin of the name, is a proper noun related to the word coto which in Spanish denotes tracts of land ceded to citizens in exchange for services to the king and where there were laurel trees.

== Boundaries ==
It is bounded on the north by Río Inabón and Lake Number 5, on the south by Esperanza Street, on the west by PR-10 (roughly), and on the east by Río Inabón. In terms of barrio-to-barrio boundaries, Coto Laurel is bounded in the north by Cerrillos and Real, in the south by Vayas, in the west by Sabanetas and Cerrillos, and in the east by the municipality of Juana Díaz.

== Features and demographics ==
Coto Laurel has 3.60 square miles (9.3 km^{2}) of land area and 0.06 square miles (160,000 m^{2}) of water area. In 2000, the population of Coto Laurel was 5,285. The population density in Coto Laurel was 1,468.1 persons per square mile.

In 2010, the population of Coto Laurel was 7,123 persons, and it had a density of 2,023.6 persons per square mile.

The communities of Palmarejo, Llanos del Sur, and El Monte are found in Coto Laurel. Lake Giles is also in Coto Laurel. Coto Laurel is crossed by Puerto Rico's superhighway PR-52. PR-14 also serves Coto Laurel.

Historical population
Census	Pop.	Note	%±
1900	1,884		—
1910	1,899		0.8%
1920	1,953		2.8%
1930	2,164		10.8%
1940	2,004		−7.4%
1950	3,026		51.0%
1960	3,907		29.1%
1970	3,940		0.8%
1980	5,192		31.8%
1990	5,915		13.9%
2000	5,285		−10.7%
2010	7,123		34.8%
U.S. Decennial Census; 1899 (shown as 1900) 1910-1930; 1930-1950 1960 1980-2000 2010

== Landmarks ==
Coto Laurel is home to Industrias Vassallo and Hospital San Cristobal, one of Ponce's largest hospitals. Coto Laurel's village square was built under the mayoral administration of José G. Tormos Vega in 1980.

== See also ==
- Bolera Caribe
- List of communities in Puerto Rico
