= Florida Technical College =

Technical college in Florida, United States

- Type: Private for-profit college
- Established: 1982
- Parent institution: Northbridge University
- President: James Michael Burkett
- Students: 2,700
- Location: Orlando, Florida, United States
- Campus: 6 campuses in Florida: Orlando, Kissimmee, Deland, Lakeland, Cutler Bay, Pembroke Pines
- Website: www.ftccollege.edu
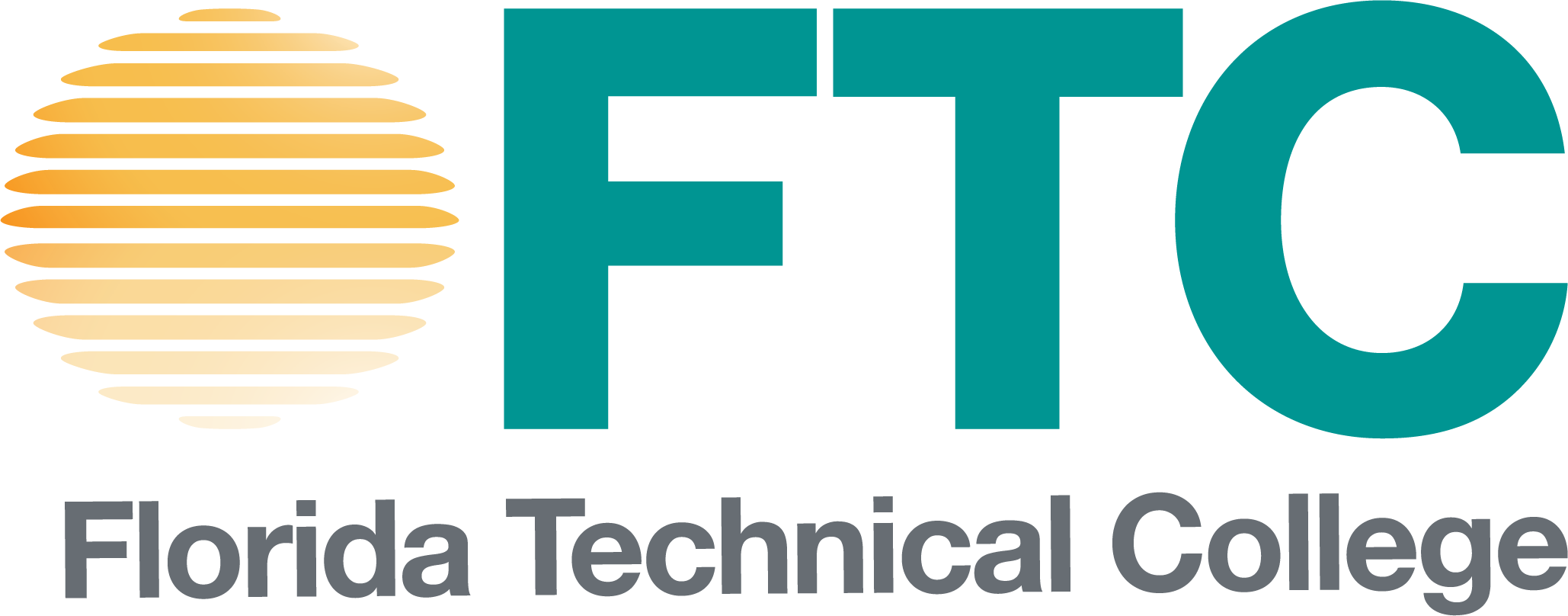

Florida Technical College is a private for-profit college with multiple campuses in Florida. It was established in 1982 and is part of Northbridge University. FTC offers associate and bachelor's degrees as well as diploma programs on seven campuses: Cutler Bay, DeLand, Orlando, Kissimmee, Pembroke Pines, Lakeland, and Tampa.

== History ==
Florida Technical College was founded in 1982 to provide post-secondary degrees. The Orlando main campus opened in 1982 and offered an approach to education that had students take one class at a time. Two years later, FTC opened a campus in Jacksonville. In 1987, the Tampa campus moved to a larger location east Tampa. FTC's Lakeland campus opened in 1990, and the DeLand campus in 1997. Classes began in Kissimmee in April 2011, the Pembroke Pines campus opened in November 2011, and the Cutler Bay campus opened for classes January 2015.

In 2016, a former administrative assistant filed a lawsuit under the False Claims Act against the school, alleging that the school had enrolled students who didn't have a high school diploma or GED to increase the school's enrollment numbers, resulting in additional federal financial aid funds. FTC cooperated with the investigation and settled the case in February 2018, agreeing to pay $600,000 and stating that the admissions staff and managers involved in the situation were no longer employed at the school.

In February 2018, Florida Technical College became an academic unit of the National University College, now known as Northbridge University. As an academic unit of National University College, FTC became accredited by the Middle States Commission on Higher Education, its parent organization's accreditor. NUC was formerly accredited by the Accrediting Council for Independent Colleges and Schools (ACICS). However, the United States Secretary of Education terminated ACICS' accrediting status, so NUC found another accreditor.

In June 2020, Orlando Magic named FTC the official technical college of the team. In October, the Miami Dolphins named the college the official culinary school of the team. Both teams partner with the school to engage in community outreach.

In 2020, FTC was named The Florida Association of Postsecondary Schools and Colleges 2020 Institution of the Year.

== See also ==
- Accrediting Council for Independent Colleges and Schools
