= Norma Vasallo Barrueta =

Cuban feminist and academic

Norma Vasallo Barrueta (sometimes Norma Vasallo) is a Cuban feminist researcher and academic, and the head of the Women's Department of the University of Havana.

== Education ==
She has a bachelor's degree in psychology, a master's degree in applied social studies, and a PhD in psychology from the University of Havana.

== Career ==
Vassallo is the head of the Women's Department of the University of Havana and a founder of its Women's Studies Group. At the University of Havana she leads research on the gender aspects of criminology, social sciences, and HIV/AIDS; she has been the president of the Women's Chair since 1998. From 1997 to 2002, she led a collaboration between the University of Havana and Carleton University in Canada.

She is featured in the 2019 documentary En busca de un espacio by Marilyn Solaya and appeared on the Cubavisión television program Cosas de Hombres.

In 2021, she was a recipient of the 60th Anniversary seal of the Federation of Cuban Women presented by Luis Antonio Torres Iríbar and Reinaldo García Zapata.

=== Selected publications ===
- (Book chapter) An Approach to Cuban Feminist Ideas and Objectives: Echoes from the Past, Voices from the Present, Feminist Philosophy in Latin America and Spain https://doi.org/10.1163/9789401204439_003
- The economic crisis and women. In memories VIII International Workshop Women in the XXI Century. ISBN 978-959-7074-92-2
- In Anthology of contemporary Cuban critical thought within the Collection Anthologies of Latin American and Caribbean Social Thought. ISBN 978-987-722-126-8
