= Salvador Vassallo (swimmer) =

Puerto Rican swimmer (born 1968)

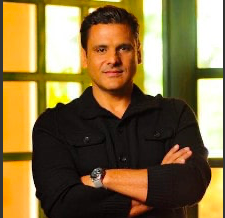

Personal information
- Born: September 16, 1968 (age 57)

Sport
- Sport: Swimming

Salvador Vassallo (born 16 September 1968) is a Puerto Rican former swimmer who competed in the 1988 Summer Olympics.

Salvador is the youngest of five sons of industrialist Víctor Vassallo and Daysi Anadón. His brothers are Marcos, Víctor (b. 1960), Jesse (b. 1961), and Vicente.
