= Salvador Vassallo (businessman) =

Puerto Rican businessman

Salvador V. Vassallo
- Salvador "Chiry" Vassallo
- Born: Salvador V. Vassallo Ruiz; 24 March 1942; Ponce, Puerto Rico
- Died: 21 January 2007 (aged 64); Ponce, Puerto Rico
- Occupation: Industrialist

Salvador V. Vassallo (24 March 1942 – 21 January 2007) was the president and CEO of Vassallo Industries, headquartered in Ponce, Puerto Rico. The company produces PVC injection moulded and extruded goods, and markets them worldwide.

== Early years ==
Vassallo (birth name: Salvador V. Vassallo Ruiz), grandparents migrated from Italy in the late 19th century and settled in the town of Yauco. Vassallo, nicknamed "Chiry", and his brothers were born in Yauco and raised in the city of Ponce where their father, Salvador Vassallo Sr., opened a hardware store.

After school hours, Vassallo and his brothers, Efraín, Víctor, Félix, and Marcos, would work in the family business. Salvador Vassallo Sr. founded Vassallo Industries, Inc., a company which initially made only windows and cement blocks.

== Salvador joins family business ==
After Vassallo graduated from college, he went to work in as a salesman for his father's business. Traveling throughout Puerto Rico taking orders from established customers, he made new contacts with potential customers. These skills would serve him well when Vassallo and his brothers inherited the business. In the 1950s, Vassallo's brother Efrain David, an engineer and the oldest of the Vassallo brothers, saw the potential in plastic.

== Vassallo Industries Inc. ==
As a consequence of Efrain's vision, in 1962 Vassallo Industries Inc. pioneered the manufacture and distribution of plastic pipe and fittings for sanitary and electrical applications. In 1972, Salvador Vassallo Sr. died and the company was inherited by his sons. Efrain David was President and Chief Executive Officer of Vassallo Industries Inc. from 1978-89. During those 11 years the firm had a net profit of over $25 million, as audited by Deloitte, Haskins & Sells, 1978-89.

In 1989, Efrain David sold his interest in Vassallo Industries and all his patents to his brothers, and joined son Efrain David Jr., in the development of the Puerto Rican marble industry. Vassallo Industries, Inc., named Salvador as its president, and the company grew to become a global leader in the manufacture of PVC. Today, it has strong brand recognition in the United States and Latin-America. In the 1980s Vassallo opened a distribution Center in Miami, Florida, to speed up order fulfillment and cut costs.

== Vassallo Molding Company and other ventures ==
In 1989 Salvador bought out his brothers and became president and chairman, assuming the CEO post in 2002. In the 1990s Vassallo founded Vassallo Molding Company for the manufacture of plastic furniture and household goods. In 1997, Home Depot became a client in addition to Kmart and Wal-Mart. The company added a research and development division to its growing empire, with emphasis on quality control. The company now has over forty patents for different PVC products.

In January 2000, Efrain Vassallo (the only Puerto Rican named National Small Businessman of the Year [in 1996], to date) rejoined his brother in Vassallo Industries Inc as a consultant. In 2003, Vassallo Industries Inc. invested $15 million in the expansion of its facility in Ponce, in an effort to produce Polyvinyl Chloride pellets for distribution in the United States, Caribbean and Latin America.

In 2004, Vassallo Industries Inc. acquired Syroco Inc., a plastics manufacturer, adding manufacturing operations in California, New York, and Arkansas. Syroco is one of the most prominent manufacturers of plastic furniture and wall decor in the United States. By acquiring Syroco, Vassallo Industries Inc. added Target, Sam's Club, Lowe's and Walgreens to its clientele.

Among the many products manufactured by the company founded by Salvador Vassallo are the following: fittings, flexible conduit, flower pots, leaf rakes, step stones, water tanks, pipes, PVC cement, kayaks and water floats. The company produces plastic furniture under the brand Signature Series Line.

== Later years ==
Vassallo's son, Rafael Vassallo, was named the president of Vassallo Industries Inc. and executive vice president of Syroco Inc. Salvador Vassallo continued to be the CEO of the company and president of the Export Council of Puerto Rico. His nephew, Jesse, (Victor's son), a swimmer, has continued the family tradition by establishing "Vassallo Unlimited".

== Death ==
On 21 January 2007, Salvador Vassallo died in the Hospital San Cristóbal in Ponce from a heart attack. He was buried in Las Mercedes Cemetery, and was survived by his wife Olga and two children, Rafael and Viviana.

The Mayor of Ponce, Francisco Zayas Seijo, declared three days of mourning and ordered the flags at Ponce's City Hall to be flown at half mast.

== See also ==
- List of Puerto Ricans
