= Industrias Vassallo =

PVC pipes manufacturer in Ponce, Puerto Rico

Coordinates: 18°2′1.97″N 66°32′55.93″W

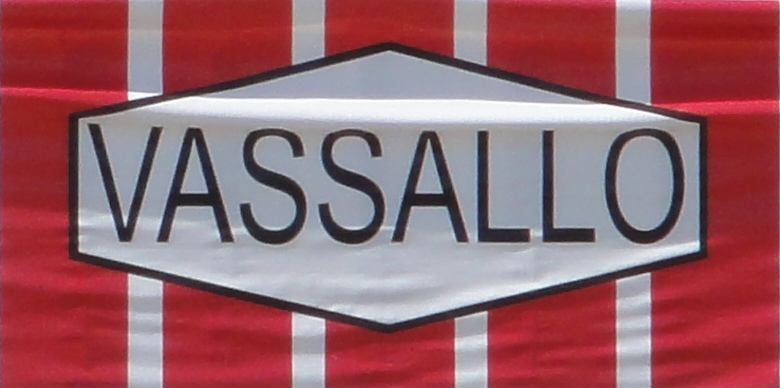
- Company type: Private
- Industry: polyvinyl chloride polyethylene polypropylene
- Founded: 1962
- Founder: Salvador Vassallo
- Headquarters: Ponce, Puerto Rico
- Area served: Puerto Rico, Caribbean, United States, Mexico, South America
- Key people: Salvador Vassallo, Chairman & CEO; Rafael V. Vassallo Collazo, President
- Products: plastic pipes sanitary household
- Number of employees: 300 (2008)
- Website: http://vassalloindustries.com

Industrias Vassallo, Inc. is a "worldwide leader" in the manufacture and distribution of PVC injection moulded and extruded goods, and manufacturer and distributor of PVC pipes and accessories, related plastics products, and resin furniture. The company is located in Barrio Coto Laurel in Ponce, Puerto Rico. In 2004, the company had a workforce of 300 employees and revenues of $51M USD. Its president is Rafael Vassallo. Salvador Vassallo was the company's CEO and president until his death in 2007.

== History ==
In 1962, the four grandsons of Vicente Vassallo Fiorimonte, an Italian immigrant who established a metal shop in Ponce, Puerto Rico, in 1898, began experimenting with making construction products from a promising new substance, polyvinyl chloride, or PVC. With an initial investment of $3,000, their decision to start manufacturing products with polyvinyl chloride (PVC) lead to the creation of a purely Puerto Rican company that has subsequently been quite successful in the plastics industry.

== Growth ==
In the last 50 years, Industrias Vassallo, Inc. was a pioneer in the production and distribution of PVC pipes and accessories for water and sanitary use. The company grew, distributing its products to countries in Central and South America, the Caribbean Basin, the United States, and Canada. Following their success of PVC pipe in the construction industry, the company established operations in the United States during the 1970s. At the same time, the company began to export to Central and South America, Canada, Mexico and the Caribbean Islands.

In 1989, Industrias Vassallo, Inc. consolidated its operations into a new 250,000-square-foot (23,000 m^{2}) industrial complex facility located in Barrio Coto Laurel, on the outskirts of Ponce, Puerto Rico. In 1997, Industrias Vassallo, Inc., engaged in the modernization of their plants, inaugurating a new rotomolding plant. The new unit made it possible to process up to 100,000 lbs of polyethylene per week. Polyethylene is a high impact plastic used for diverse products, such as water tanks, security barriers, kayaks and flowerpots.

In 2004, Industrias Vassallo acquired Syroco Incorporated, a company founded by Adolph Holstein in the late 19th century. Industrias Vassallo took over the plants and assets in Arkansas, Corona, Calif., and two in New York state, near Baldwinsville, NY.

In 2005, and due to the increasing cost of electricity, the company considered moving its operations to the United States, but the plans were abandoned after successful negotiations with the commonwealth government.

Despite the optimism in acquiring Syroco, the company had to develop a production strategy that would reduce expenses such as electricity cost. Due to the high cost of electricity in Puerto Rico versus Arkansas, USA, Vassallo saw a savings to the company between 10 and 13 cents per kilowatt in energy bills. As a result, ultimately the company moved all of its production facilities to the United States, and by 2011 its manufacturing facilities in Coto Laurel, Ponce, were being rented out to a college named Caribbean University. The company does continue to have a presence in Coto Laurel, where it maintains its corporate offices.

== Diversification ==
From manufacturing and distribution of plastic pipe and accessories for sanitary and electrical applications, the company diversified into plastic furniture and accessories for household use. The company manufactures products of diverse plastic materials, among them: polyvinyl chloride (PVC), polyethylene, and polypropylene.

In 1983, the company established Vassallo Research & Development Corporation, to fill its R&D needs, and further enhance its product line. "The company now holds scores of world-wide patents and is constantly developing new processes and products. Many have set national regulatory quality standards for the industry."

== Certifications ==
Industrias Vassallo, Inc. manufactures as per the specifications established by the American Society for Testing and Materials (ASTM) agency. The company is also certified by recognized regulatory agencies such as the American Water Works Association (AWWA), the Canadian Standards Association (CSA), the National Sanitary Foundation (NSF), Factory Mutual (FM), and Underwriters Laboratories (UL).

== Reorganization ==
The acquisition of a company in Arkansas turned to be a bad investment for the company. In 2008, Vassallo Industries had to reorganize under Chapter 11 bankruptcy, resulting mostly from failures at the Arkansas operation. Upon reorganization a new company was created on August 26, 2010, Vassallo International Group, Inc. (VINGI), with Rafael Vassallo Collazo as its president.

== See also ==
- Salvador Vassallo
- Ponce, Puerto Rico
