= Northbridge University =

Private university in Puerto Rico

- National College of Business and Technology
- Former names: National University College (1984-2020); NUC University (2020-2026) Northbridge University (2026-Present)
- Motto: Excellentia Integritas Novus Comprǒmissum
- Motto in English: A new commitment and integrity of excellence
- Type: Private, for profit
- Established: 1982; 44 years ago
- Accreditation: CHEPR, MSCHE, ACICS
- Affiliations: EduK Group
- President: José Córdova
- Faculty: 221
- Students: 20,000
- Location: Bayamón, Puerto Rico
- Campus: Both Urban and Suburban
- Colors: Navy and gold
- Website: www.northbridge.edu

Northbridge University (formerly NUC University) is the largest for-profit private university in Puerto Rico with its main campus in Bayamón, Puerto Rico. The university was founded in 1982 as the National College, and offers undergraduate studies and graduate studies in health, business administration, education, information technology, and criminal justice.

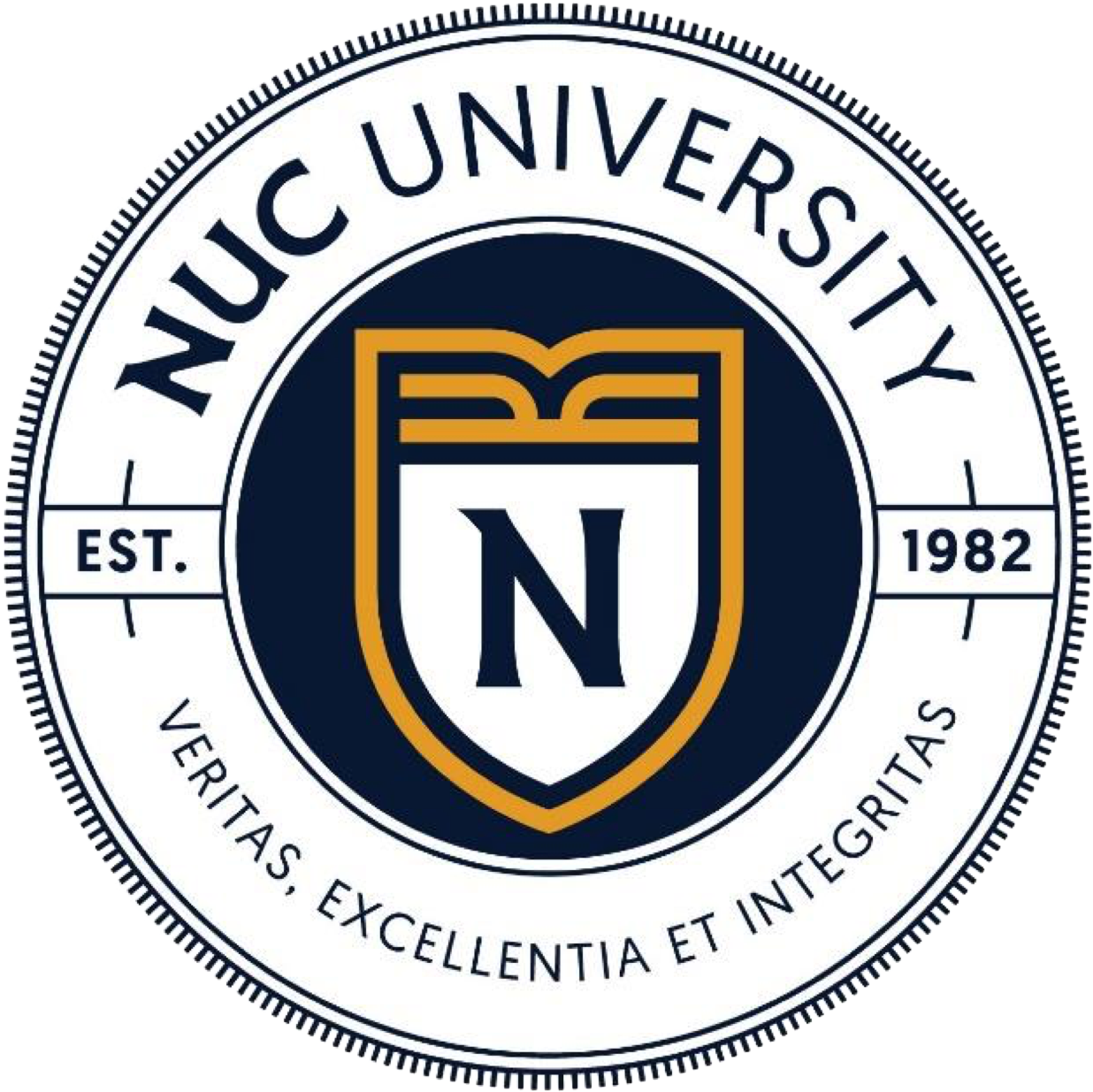
NUC University 2020 Seal

Northbridge University is accredited by the Council of Higher Education of Puerto Rico and the Middle States Commission on Higher Education.

== History ==
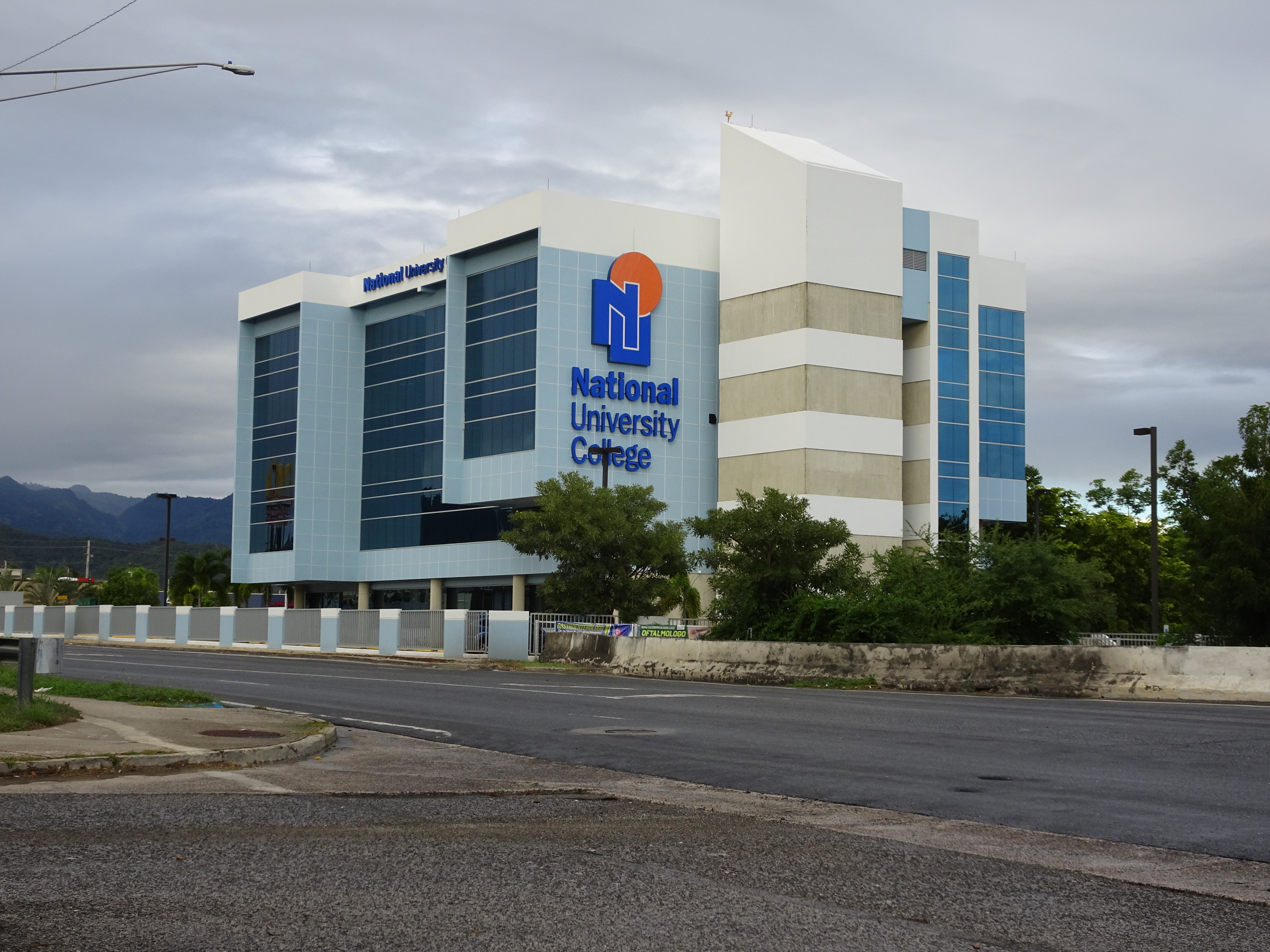
Northbridge University in Ponce, Puerto Rico

In 1980, a steering committee, led by Jesús Siverio Orta, worked on the planning and organization of the institution. It was not until the first of April, 1982 that the institution began its educational operations in Bayamón, Puerto Rico under the name National College of Business and Technology. In June of the same year, the committee acquired the Polytechnical Community College, obtaining at the same time its operating license from the Puerto Rico Department of Education with the same rights, privileges and obligations as the predecessor institution.

Northbridge University (Previously NUC University) began its educational program with four classrooms on the third floor of the Ramos Building located in the city of Bayamón, which also had a typing laboratory, a pharmacy laboratory and a library. Initially, the institution only offered Pharmacy Assistant and Secretarial Science programs. The first group of students from these two programs graduated in July 1983.

In 1984 it opened the Arecibo Campus in Arecibo, Puerto Rico, and in 2003 the Río Grande Campus in Río Grande, Puerto Rico. In the following years Northbridge University started expanding rapidly, establishing a learning center at the San Cristóbal Hospital on September 2007 in Ponce, Puerto Rico which later became the Ponce Campus on July 10, 2009. In January 2011, NU opened an additional location in Caguas, Puerto Rico and in June 2014, it became the Caguas Campus.

In March 2017, NU opened a Campus in Mayagüez, Puerto Rico, and in November 2018, the institution opened it most recent campus, the South Florida Campus in the State of Florida.

== Campuses ==
The multi-campus school is one of the largest secondary education institutions in Puerto Rico. Today Northbridge University has 15 campuses, nine of them in the State of Florida, and 10 centers of the technical division.

Puerto Rico Campuses:

- Northbridge University Arecibo
- Northbridge University Bayamón
- Northbridge University Caguas
- Northbridge University Escorial
- Northbridge University Mayagüez
- Northbridge University Ponce
- Northbridge University Río Grande
- Northbridge University - Coloumbia Central Caguas
- Northbridge University - Coloumbia Central Bayamón
- Northbridge University - Escuela Técnica Aguadilla
- Northbridge University - Escuela Técnica Arecibo
- Northbridge University - Escuela Técnica Bayamón
- Northbridge University - Escuela Técnica Caguas
- Northbridge University - Escuela Técnica Guayama
- Northbridge University - Escuela Técnica Los Colobos, Carolina
- Northbridge University - Escuela Técnica Manatí
- Northbridge University - Escuela Técnica Mayagüez
- Northbridge University - Escuela Técnica Ponce
- Northbridge University - Escuela Técnica Yauco

Florida Campuses:

- Northbridge University South Florida
- Northbridge University Deland
- Northbridge University Kissimmee
- Northbridge University Orlando
- Northbridge University Pembroke Pines
- Northbridge University South Miami
- Northbridge University Lakeland
- Northbridge University Tampa
- The DAVE School

Oregon Campuses:

- Hillsboro Aero Academy

== Accreditations ==
Northbridge University (Previously NUC University) is authorized by the Council of Higher Education of Puerto Rico and accredited by the Middle States Commission on Higher Education to offer university studies of the undergraduate, graduate and professional levels, as the case may be. Likewise, the university is committed to the professional accreditation of its academic programs. For this reason, some academic units have programs accredited by organizations, such as:

- Accreditation Commission for Education in Nursing (ACEN)
- Commission on Accreditation in Physical Therapy Education (CAPTE)
- Council for the Accreditation of Educator Preparation (CAEP)
- American Culinary Federation Education Foundation Accrediting Commission (ACFEFAC)

=== Certifications and authorizations ===
The institution is also authorized and certified by the following entities:

- Puerto Rico State Approving Agency for Veterans Education
- Microsoft IT Program
- U.S. Department of Education
- Vocational Rehabilitation

=== Memberships ===
- Puerto Rico Private Education Association
- Association of Student Financial Aid Administrators of Puerto Rico
- American Association of Collegiate Registrars and Admissions Officers
- Association of Private Sector Colleges and Universities
- National Association of Student Financial Aid Administrators
