= Time in physics =

Fundamental quantity in physics

Time
- Common symbols: t
- SI unit: second (s)
- Other units: see unit of time
- Dimension: $\mathsf{T}$

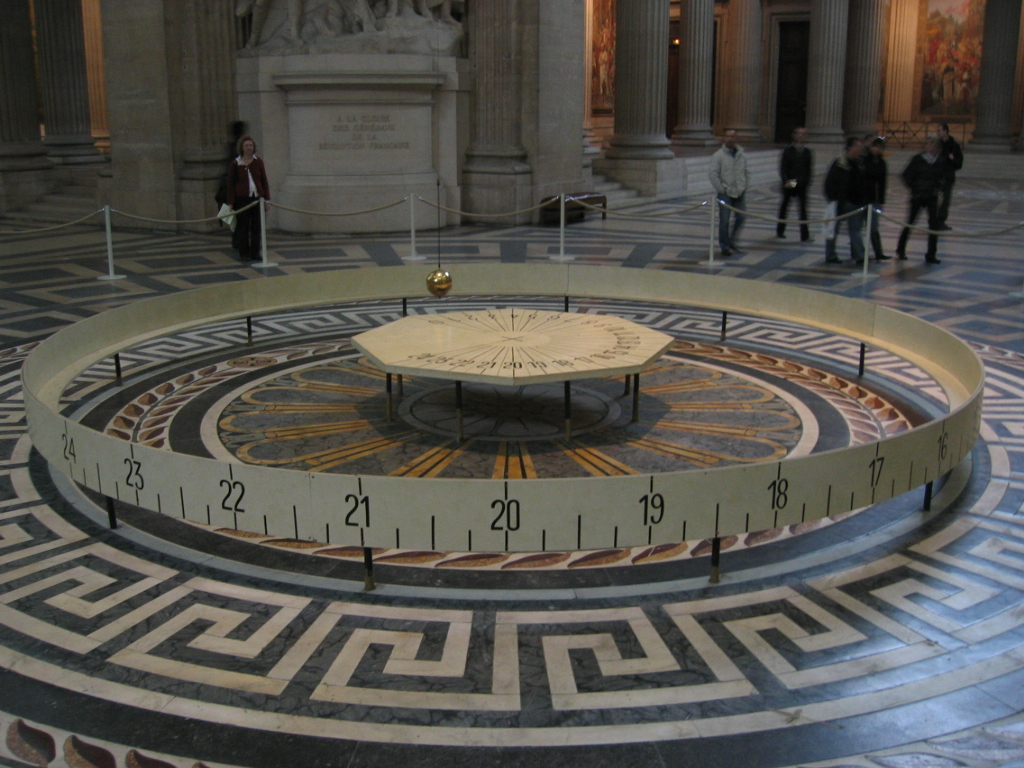
Foucault's pendulum in the Panthéon of Paris can measure time as well as demonstrate the rotation of Earth.

In physics, time is defined by its measurement: time is what a clock reads. In classical, non-relativistic physics, it is a scalar quantity (often denoted by the symbol $t$) and, like length, mass, and charge, is usually described as a fundamental quantity. Time can be combined mathematically with other physical quantities to derive other concepts such as motion, kinetic energy and time-dependent fields. Timekeeping is a complex of technological and scientific issues, and part of the foundation of recordkeeping.

== Markers of time ==
Before there were clocks, time was measured by those physical processes which were understandable to each epoch of civilization:

- the first appearance (see: heliacal rising) of Sirius to mark the flooding of the Nile each year
- the periodic succession of night and day, seemingly eternally
- the position on the horizon of the first appearance of the sun at dawn
- the position of the sun in the sky
- the marking of the moment of noontime during the day
- the length of the shadow cast by a gnomon

Eventually, it became possible to characterize the passage of time with instrumentation, using operational definitions. Simultaneously, our conception of time has evolved, as shown below.

== Unit of measurement of time ==
In the International System of Units (SI), the unit of time is the second (symbol: s). It has been defined since 1967 as "the duration of 9192631770 periods of the radiation corresponding to the transition between the two hyperfine levels of the ground state of the caesium 133 atom", and is an SI base unit. This definition is based on the operation of a caesium atomic clock. These clocks became practical for use as primary reference standards after about 1955, and have been in use ever since.

=== State of the art in timekeeping ===
The UTC timestamp in use worldwide is an atomic time standard. The relative accuracy of such a time standard is currently on the order of 10^{−15} (corresponding to 1 second in approximately 30 million years). The smallest time step considered theoretically observable is called the Planck time, which is approximately 5.391×10^{−44} seconds – many orders of magnitude below the resolution of current time standards.

The caesium atomic clock became practical after 1950, when advances in electronics enabled reliable measurement of the microwave frequencies it generates. As further advances occurred, atomic clock research has progressed to ever-higher frequencies, which can provide higher accuracy and higher precision. Clocks based on these techniques have been developed, but are not yet in use as primary reference standards.

== Conceptions of time ==
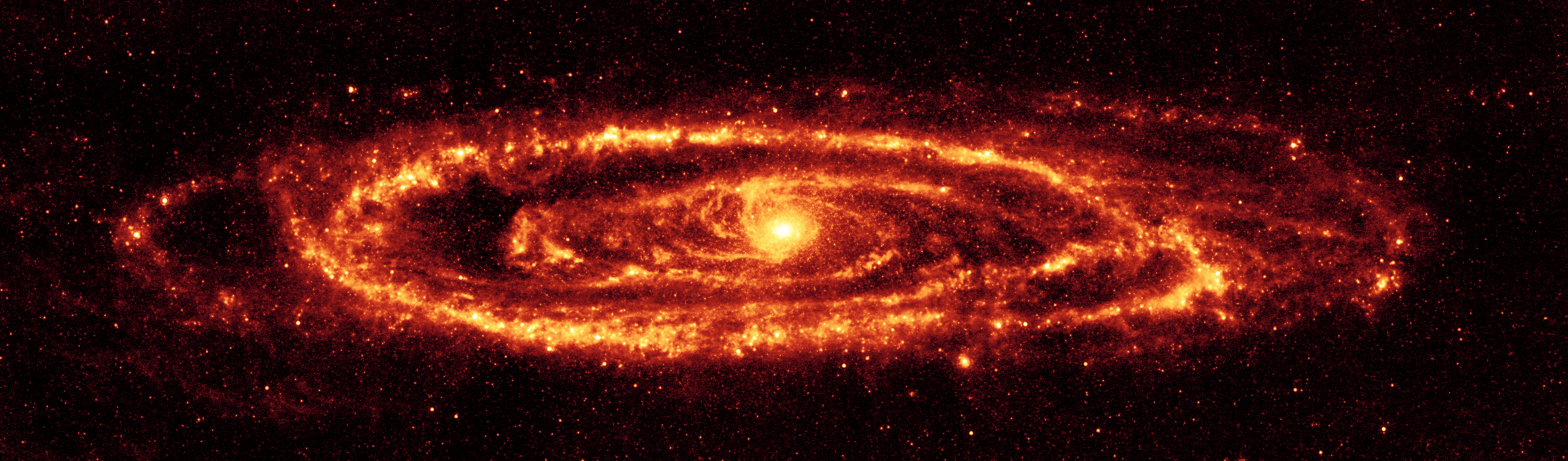
Andromeda galaxy (M31) is two million light-years away. Thus we are viewing M31's light from two million years ago, a time before humans existed on Earth.

Galileo, Newton, and most people up until the 20th century thought that time was the same for everyone everywhere. This is the basis for timelines, where time is a parameter. The modern understanding of time is based on Einstein's theory of relativity, in which rates of time run differently depending on relative motion, and space and time are merged into spacetime, where we live on a world line rather than a timeline. In this view time is a coordinate. According to the prevailing cosmological model of the Big Bang theory, time itself began as part of the entire Universe about 13.8 billion years ago.

=== Regularities in nature ===
In order to measure time, one can record the number of occurrences (events) of some periodic phenomenon. The regular recurrences of the seasons, the motions of the sun, moon and stars were noted and tabulated for millennia, before the laws of physics were formulated. The sun was the arbiter of the flow of time, but time was known only to the hour for millennia, hence, the use of the gnomon was known across most of the world, especially Eurasia, and at least as far southward as the jungles of Southeast Asia.

In particular, the astronomical observatories maintained for religious purposes became accurate enough to ascertain the regular motions of the stars, and even some of the planets.

At first, timekeeping was done by hand by priests, and then for commerce, with watchmen to note time as part of their duties. The tabulation of the equinoxes, the sandglass, and the water clock became more and more accurate, and finally reliable. For ships at sea, marine sandglasses were used. These devices allowed sailors to call the hours, and to calculate sailing velocity.

==== Mechanical clocks ====
Richard of Wallingford (1292–1336), abbot of St. Albans Abbey, famously built a mechanical clock as an astronomical orrery about 1330.

By the time of Richard of Wallingford, the use of ratchets and gears allowed the towns of Europe to create mechanisms to display the time on their respective town clocks; by the time of the scientific revolution, the clocks became miniaturized enough for families to share a personal clock, or perhaps a pocket watch. At first, only kings could afford them. Pendulum clocks were widely used in the 18th and 19th century. They have largely been replaced in general use by quartz and digital clocks. Atomic clocks can theoretically keep accurate time for millions of years. They are appropriate for standards and scientific use.

=== Galileo: the flow of time ===
In 1583, Galileo Galilei (1564–1642) discovered that a pendulum's harmonic motion has a constant period, which he learned by timing the motion of a swaying lamp in harmonic motion at mass at the cathedral of Pisa, with his pulse.

In his Two New Sciences (1638), Galileo used a water clock to measure the time taken for a bronze ball to roll a known distance down an inclined plane; this clock was:

...a large vessel of water placed in an elevated position; to the bottom of this vessel was soldered a pipe of small diameter giving a thin jet of water, which we collected in a small glass during the time of each descent, whether for the whole length of the channel or for a part of its length; the water thus collected was weighed, after each descent, on a very accurate balance; the differences and ratios of these weights gave us the differences and ratios of the times, and this with such accuracy that although the operation was repeated many, many times, there was no appreciable discrepancy in the results.

Galileo's experimental setup to measure the literal flow of time, in order to describe the motion of a ball, preceded Isaac Newton's statement in his Principia, "I do not define time, space, place and motion, as being well known to all."

The Galilean transformations assume that time is the same for all reference frames.

=== Newtonian physics: linear time ===
In or around 1665, when Isaac Newton (1643–1727) derived the motion of objects falling under gravity, the first clear formulation for mathematical physics of a treatment of time began: linear time, conceived as a universal clock.

Absolute, true, and mathematical time, of itself, and from its own nature flows equably without regard to anything external, and by another name is called duration: relative, apparent, and common time, is some sensible and external (whether accurate or unequable) measure of duration by the means of motion, which is commonly used instead of true time; such as an hour, a day, a month, a year.

The water clock mechanism described by Galileo was engineered to provide laminar flow of the water during the experiments, thus providing a constant flow of water for the durations of the experiments, and embodying what Newton called duration.

In this section, the relationships listed below treat time as a parameter which serves as an index to the behavior of the physical system under consideration. Because Newton's fluents treat a linear flow of time (what he called mathematical time), time could be considered to be a linearly varying parameter, an abstraction of the march of the hours on the face of a clock. Calendars and ship's logs could then be mapped to the march of the hours, days, months, years and centuries.

=== Thermodynamics and the paradox of irreversibility ===
By 1798, Benjamin Thompson (1753–1814) had discovered that work could be transformed to heat without limit – a precursor of the conservation of energy or

- 1st law of thermodynamics

In 1824 Sadi Carnot (1796–1832) scientifically analyzed the steam engine with his Carnot cycle, an abstract engine. Rudolf Clausius (1822–1888) noted a measure of disorder, or entropy, which affects the continually decreasing amount of free energy which is available to a Carnot engine in the:

- 2nd law of thermodynamics

Thus the continual march of a thermodynamic system, from lesser to greater entropy, at any given temperature, defines an arrow of time. In particular, Stephen Hawking identifies three arrows of time:

- Psychological arrow of time – our perception of an inexorable flow.
- Thermodynamic arrow of time – distinguished by the growth of entropy.
- Cosmological arrow of time – distinguished by the expansion of the universe.

With time, entropy increases in an isolated thermodynamic system. In contrast, Erwin Schrödinger (1887–1961) pointed out that life depends on a "negative entropy flow". Ilya Prigogine (1917–2003) stated that other thermodynamic systems which, like life, are also far from equilibrium, can also exhibit stable spatio-temporal structures that reminisce life. Soon afterward, the Belousov–Zhabotinsky reactions were reported, which demonstrate oscillating colors in a chemical solution. These nonequilibrium thermodynamic branches reach a bifurcation point, which is unstable, and another thermodynamic branch becomes stable in its stead.

=== Electromagnetism and the speed of light ===
In 1864, James Clerk Maxwell (1831–1879) presented a combined theory of electricity and magnetism. He combined all the laws then known relating to those two phenomenon into four equations. These equations are known as Maxwell's equations for electromagnetism; they allow for solutions in the form of electromagnetic waves and propagate at a fixed speed, c, regardless of the velocity of the electric charge that generated them.

The fact that light is predicted to always travel at speed c would be incompatible with Galilean relativity if Maxwell's equations were assumed to hold in any inertial frame (reference frame with constant velocity), because the Galilean transformations predict the speed to decrease (or increase) in the reference frame of an observer traveling parallel (or antiparallel) to the light.

It was expected that there was one absolute reference frame, that of the luminiferous aether, in which Maxwell's equations held unmodified in the known form.

The Michelson–Morley experiment failed to detect any difference in the relative speed of light due to the motion of the Earth relative to the luminiferous aether, suggesting that Maxwell's equations did, in fact, hold in all frames. In 1875, Hendrik Lorentz (1853–1928) discovered Lorentz transformations, which left Maxwell's equations unchanged, allowing Michelson and Morley's negative result to be explained. Henri Poincaré (1854–1912) noted the importance of Lorentz's transformation and popularized it. In particular, the railroad car description can be found in Science and Hypothesis, which was published before Einstein's articles of 1905.

The Lorentz transformation predicted space contraction and time dilation; until 1905, the former was interpreted as a physical contraction of objects moving with respect to the aether, due to the modification of the intermolecular forces (of electric nature), while the latter was thought to be just a mathematical stipulation.

=== Relativistic physics: spacetime ===
Albert Einstein's 1905 special relativity challenged the notion of absolute time, and could only formulate a definition of synchronization for clocks that mark a linear flow of time:

If at the point A of space there is a clock, an observer at A can determine the time values of events in the immediate proximity of A by finding the positions of the hands which are simultaneous with these events. If there is at the point B of space another clock in all respects resembling the one at A, it is possible for an observer at B to determine the time values of events in the immediate neighbourhood of B.

But it is not possible without further assumption to compare, in respect of time, an event at A with an event at B. We have so far defined only an "A time" and a "B time".

We have not defined a common "time" for A and B, for the latter cannot be defined at all unless we establish by definition that the "time" required by light to travel from A to B equals the "time" it requires to travel from B to A. Let a ray of light start at the "A time" t_{A} from A towards B, let it at the "B time" t_{B} be reflected at B in the direction of A, and arrive again at A at the “A time” t′_{A}.

In accordance with definition the two clocks synchronize if

$$t_\text{B} - t_\text{A} = t'_\text{A} - t_\text{B}\text{.}\,\!$$

We assume that this definition of synchronism is free from contradictions, and possible for any number of points; and that the following relations are universally valid:—

1. If the clock at B synchronizes with the clock at A, the clock at A synchronizes with the clock at B.
2. If the clock at A synchronizes with the clock at B and also with the clock at C, the clocks at B and C also synchronize with each other.

— Albert Einstein, "On the Electrodynamics of Moving Bodies"

Einstein showed that if the speed of light is not changing between reference frames, space and time must be so that the moving observer will measure the same speed of light as the stationary one because velocity is defined by space and time:

$\mathbf{v}={d\mathbf{r}\over dt} \text{,}$ where r is position and t is time.

Indeed, the Lorentz transformation (for two reference frames in relative motion, whose x axis is directed in the direction of the relative velocity)

$$\begin{cases}
t' &= \gamma(t - vx/c^2) \text{ where } \gamma = 1/\sqrt{1-v^2/c^2} \\
x' &= \gamma(x - vt)\\
y' &= y \\
z' &= z
\end{cases}$$

can be said to "mix" space and time in a way similar to the way a Euclidean rotation around the z axis mixes x and y coordinates. Consequences of this include relativity of simultaneity.

Event B is simultaneous with A in the green reference frame, but it occurred before in the blue frame, and will occur later in the red frame.

More specifically, the Lorentz transformation is a hyperbolic rotation

$$\begin{pmatrix}
ct' \\
x'
\end{pmatrix}
=
\begin{pmatrix}
\cosh \phi & - \sinh \phi  \\
- \sinh \phi & \cosh \phi
\end{pmatrix}
\begin{pmatrix}
ct \\
x
\end{pmatrix} \text{ where } \phi = \operatorname{artanh}\,\frac{v}{c} \text{,}$$

which is a change of coordinates in the four-dimensional Minkowski space, a dimension of which is ct. (In Euclidean space an ordinary rotation

$$\begin{pmatrix}
x' \\
y'
\end{pmatrix}
=
\begin{pmatrix}
\cos \theta & - \sin \theta  \\
\sin \theta & \cos \theta
\end{pmatrix}
\begin{pmatrix}
x \\
y
\end{pmatrix}$$

is the corresponding change of coordinates.) The speed of light c can be seen as just a conversion factor needed because we measure the dimensions of spacetime in different units; since the metre is currently defined in terms of the second, it has the exact value of 299 792 458 m/s. We would need a similar factor in Euclidean space if, for example, we measured width in nautical miles and depth in feet. In physics, sometimes units of measurement in which c = 1 are used to simplify equations.

Time in a "moving" reference frame is shown to run more slowly than in a "stationary" one by the following relation (which can be derived by the Lorentz transformation by putting ∆x′ = 0, ∆τ = ∆t′):

$$\Delta t= {{\Delta \tau}\over\sqrt{1 - v^2/c^2}}$$

where:

- $\Delta\tau$ is the time between two events as measured in the moving reference frame in which they occur at the same place (e.g. two ticks on a moving clock); it is called the proper time between the two events;
- $\Delta$t is the time between these same two events, but as measured in the stationary reference frame;
- v is the speed of the moving reference frame relative to the stationary one;
- c is the speed of light.

Moving objects therefore are said to show a slower passage of time. This is known as time dilation.

These transformations are only valid for two frames at constant relative velocity. Naively applying them to other situations gives rise to such paradoxes as the twin paradox.

That paradox can be resolved using for instance Einstein's General theory of relativity, which uses Riemannian geometry, geometry in accelerated, noninertial reference frames. Employing the metric tensor which describes Minkowski space:

$$\left[(dx^1)^2+(dx^2)^2+(dx^3)^2-c(dt)^2)\right],$$

Einstein developed a geometric solution to Lorentz's transformation that preserves Maxwell's equations. His field equations give an exact relationship between the measurements of space and time in a given region of spacetime and the energy density of that region.

Einstein's equations predict that time should be altered by the presence of gravitational fields (see the Schwarzschild metric):

$$T=\frac{dt}{\sqrt{\left( 1 - \frac{2GM}{rc^2} \right ) dt^2 - \frac{1}{c^2}\left ( 1 - \frac{2GM}{rc^2} \right )^{-1} dr^2 - \frac{r^2}{c^2} d\theta^2 - \frac{r^2}{c^2} \sin^2 \theta \; d\phi^2}}$$

where:

- $T$ is the gravitational time dilation of an object at a distance of $r$.
- $dt$ is the change in coordinate time, or the interval of coordinate time.
- $G$ is the gravitational constant
- $M$ is the mass generating the field
- $\sqrt{\left( 1 - \frac{2GM}{rc^2} \right ) dt^2 - \frac{1}{c^2}\left ( 1 - \frac{2GM}{rc^2} \right )^{-1} dr^2 - \frac{r^2}{c^2} d\theta^2 - \frac{r^2}{c^2} \sin^2 \theta \; d\phi^2}$ is the change in proper time $d\tau$, or the interval of proper time.

Or one could use the following simpler approximation:

$$\frac{dt}{d\tau} =  \frac{1}{ \sqrt{1 - \left( \frac{2GM}{rc^2} \right)}}.$$

That is, the stronger the gravitational field (and, thus, the larger the acceleration), the more slowly time runs. The predictions of time dilation are confirmed by particle acceleration experiments and cosmic ray evidence, where moving particles decay more slowly than their less energetic counterparts. Gravitational time dilation gives rise to the phenomenon of gravitational redshift and Shapiro signal travel time delays near massive objects such as the sun. The Global Positioning System must also adjust signals to account for this effect.

According to Einstein's general theory of relativity, a freely moving particle traces a history in spacetime that maximises its proper time. This phenomenon is also referred to as the principle of maximal aging, and was described by Taylor and Wheeler as:

"Principle of Extremal Aging: The path a free object takes between two events in spacetime is the path for which the time lapse between these events, recorded on the object's wristwatch, is an extremum."

Einstein's theory was motivated by the assumption that every point in the universe can be treated as a 'center', and that correspondingly, physics must act the same in all reference frames. His simple and elegant theory shows that time is relative to an inertial frame. In an inertial frame, Newton's first law holds; it has its own local geometry, and therefore its own measurements of space and time; there is no 'universal clock'. An act of synchronization must be performed between two systems, at the least.

=== Time in quantum mechanics ===
There is a time parameter in the equations of quantum mechanics. The Schrödinger equation is

$$H(t) \left| \psi (t) \right\rangle = i \hbar {\partial\over\partial t} \left| \psi (t) \right\rangle$$

One solution can be

$$| \psi_e(t) \rangle = e^{-iHt / \hbar} | \psi_e(0) \rangle$$.

where $e^{-iHt / \hbar}$ is called the time evolution operator, and H is the Hamiltonian.

But the Schrödinger picture shown above is equivalent to the Heisenberg picture, which enjoys a similarity to the Poisson brackets of classical mechanics. The Poisson brackets are superseded by a nonzero commutator, say [H, A] for observable A, and Hamiltonian H:

$$\frac{d}{dt}A=(i\hbar)^{-1}[A,H]+\left(\frac{\partial A}{\partial t}\right)_\mathrm{classical}.$$

This equation denotes an uncertainty relation in quantum physics. For example, with time (the observable A), the energy E (from the Hamiltonian H) gives:

$$\Delta E \Delta T \ge \frac{\hbar}{2}$$

where

- $\Delta E$ is the uncertainty in energy
- $\Delta T$ is the uncertainty in time
- $\hbar$ is the reduced Planck constant

The more precisely one measures the duration of a sequence of events, the less precisely one can measure the energy associated with that sequence, and vice versa. This equation is different from the standard uncertainty principle, because time is not an operator in quantum mechanics.

Corresponding commutator relations also hold for momentum p and position q, which are conjugate variables of each other, along with a corresponding uncertainty principle in momentum and position, similar to the energy and time relation above.

Quantum mechanics explains the properties of the periodic table of the elements. Starting with Otto Stern's and Walter Gerlach's experiment with molecular beams in a magnetic field, Isidor Rabi (1898–1988), was able to modulate the magnetic resonance of the beam. In 1945 Rabi then suggested that this technique be the basis of a clock using the resonant frequency of an atomic beam. In 2021 Jun Ye of JILA in Boulder Colorado observed time dilatation in the difference in the rate of optical lattice clock ticks at the top of a cloud of strontium atoms, than at the bottom of that cloud, a column one millimeter tall, under the influence of gravity.

=== Time operator and Pauli's theorem ===
That time enters quantum mechanics only as a parameter and not as an observable is the content of an argument given by Wolfgang Pauli in 1933, often called Pauli's theorem. A self-adjoint time operator $\hat T$ canonically conjugate to the Hamiltonian, $[\hat T,\hat H]=i\hbar$, would generate continuous shifts of the energy in the same way as the momentum operator generates translations in position, so that the spectrum of $\hat H$ would have to be the whole real line. Since the energy of physical systems is bounded from below, and often discrete, Pauli concluded that "the introduction of an operator t must fundamentally be abandoned" and that time must remain an ordinary number in quantum mechanics. The argument is not rigorous, since it ignores the domains of the unbounded operators involved; Eric Galapon showed in 2002 that for Hamiltonians with a purely discrete, bounded spectrum, bounded self-adjoint operators exist which satisfy the canonical commutation relation on a dense subspace, so that Pauli's conclusion holds only if the relation is required in the stronger Weyl form.

Because time is not an operator, the energy–time uncertainty relation cannot be derived from a commutator like the position–momentum relation. Its standard form, due to Mandelstam and Tamm, reads $\Delta E\,\tau_A \ge \hbar/2$ for any observable $A$, where $\tau_A=\Delta A/|d\langle A\rangle/dt|$ is the time in which the expectation value of $A$ changes by one standard deviation; the "time uncertainty" is thus a time scale derived from the dynamics rather than the spread of a time observable. Yakir Aharonov and David Bohm pointed out in 1961 that the energy of a system can be measured to arbitrary accuracy in an arbitrarily short time, so that there is no uncertainty relation between energy and the duration of a measurement.

Measurements of time – such as the time of arrival of a particle at a detector – are nevertheless described within quantum mechanics by giving up self-adjointness and representing time observables by positive operator-valued measures, which are covariant under time translations and exist also for Hamiltonians bounded from below. A different approach, proposed by Don Page and William Wootters in 1983, regards time as a correlation between subsystems: in a closed system whose total state is stationary, as required by the Wheeler–DeWitt equation, the state of one part conditioned on the reading of a "clock" subsystem undergoes exactly the Schrödinger evolution that an external observer would describe with a time parameter ("evolution without evolution").

== Dynamical systems ==
One could say that time is a parametrization (geometry) of a dynamical system that allows the geometry of the system to be manifested and operated on. It has been asserted that time is an implicit consequence of chaos (i.e. nonlinearity/irreversibility): the characteristic time, or rate of information entropy production, of a system. Mandelbrot introduces intrinsic time in his book Multifractals and 1/f noise.

=== Time crystals ===
Khemani, Moessner, and Sondhi define a time crystal as a "stable, conservative, macroscopic clock".

== Signalling ==
Signalling is one application of the electromagnetic waves described above. In general, a signal is part of communication between parties and places. One example might be a yellow ribbon tied to a tree, or the ringing of a church bell. A signal can be part of a conversation, which involves a protocol. Another signal might be the position of the hour hand on a town clock or a railway station. An interested party might wish to view that clock, to learn the time. See: Time ball, an early form of Time signal.

Evolution of a world line of an accelerated massive particle. This world line is restricted to the timelike top and bottom sections of this spacetime figure; this world line cannot cross the top (future) or the bottom (past) light cone. The left and right sections (which are outside the light cones) are spacelike.

We as observers can still signal different parties and places as long as we live within their past light cone. But we cannot receive signals from those parties and places outside our past light cone.

Along with the formulation of the equations for the electromagnetic wave, the field of telecommunication could be founded.

In 19th century telegraphy, electrical circuits, some spanning continents and oceans, could transmit codes - simple dots, dashes and spaces. From this, a series of technical issues have emerged; see Category:Synchronization. But it is safe to say that our signalling systems can be only approximately synchronized, a plesiochronous condition, from which jitter need be eliminated.

That said, systems can be synchronized (at an engineering approximation), using technologies like GPS. The GPS satellites must account for the effects of gravitation and other relativistic factors in their circuitry. See: Self-clocking signal.

== Technology for timekeeping standards ==
The primary time standard in the U.S. is currently NIST-F1, a laser-cooled Cs fountain, the latest in a series of time and frequency standards, from the ammonia-based atomic clock (1949) to the caesium-based NBS-1 (1952) to NIST-7 (1993). The respective clock uncertainty declined from 10,000 nanoseconds per day to 0.5 nanoseconds per day in 5 decades. In 2001 the clock uncertainty for NIST-F1 was 0.1 nanoseconds/day. Development of increasingly accurate frequency standards is underway.

In this time and frequency standard, a population of caesium atoms is laser-cooled to temperatures of one microkelvin. The atoms collect in a ball shaped by six lasers, two for each spatial dimension, vertical (up/down), horizontal (left/right), and back/forth. The vertical lasers push the caesium ball through a microwave cavity. As the ball is cooled, the caesium population cools to its ground state and emits light at its natural frequency, stated in the definition of second above. Eleven physical effects are accounted for in the emissions from the caesium population, which are then controlled for in the NIST-F1 clock. These results are reported to BIPM.

Additionally, a reference hydrogen maser is also reported to BIPM as a frequency standard for International Atomic Time (TAI).

The measurement of time is overseen by BIPM (Bureau International des Poids et Mesures), located in Sèvres, France, which ensures uniformity of measurements and their traceability to the International System of Units (SI) worldwide. BIPM operates under authority of the Metre Convention, a diplomatic treaty between fifty-one nations, the Member States of the convention, through a series of Consultative Committees, whose members are the respective national metrology laboratories.

== Time in cosmology ==
The equations of general relativity predict a non-static universe. However, Einstein accepted only a static universe, and modified the Einstein field equation to reflect this by adding the cosmological constant, which he later described as his "biggest blunder". But in 1927, Georges Lemaître (1894–1966) argued, on the basis of general relativity, that the universe originated in a primordial explosion. At the fifth Solvay conference, that year, Einstein brushed him off with "Vos calculs sont corrects, mais votre physique est abominable." (“Your math is correct, but your physics is abominable”). In 1929, Edwin Hubble (1889–1953) announced his discovery of the expanding universe. The current generally accepted cosmological model, the Lambda-CDM model, has a positive cosmological constant and thus not only an expanding universe but an accelerating expanding universe.

If the universe were expanding, then it must have been much smaller and therefore hotter and denser in the past. George Gamow (1904–1968) hypothesized that the abundance of the elements in the Periodic Table of the Elements, might be accounted for by nuclear reactions in a hot dense universe. He was disputed by Fred Hoyle (1915–2001), who invented the term 'Big Bang' to disparage it. Fermi and others noted that this process would have stopped after only the light elements were created, and thus did not account for the abundance of heavier elements.

WMAP fluctuations of the cosmic microwave background radiation

Gamow's prediction was a 5–10-kelvin black-body radiation temperature for the universe, after it cooled during the expansion. This was corroborated by Penzias and Wilson in 1965. Subsequent experiments arrived at a 2.7 kelvins temperature, corresponding to an age of the universe of 13.8 billion years after the Big Bang.

This dramatic result has raised issues: what happened between the singularity of the Big Bang and the Planck time, which, after all, is the smallest observable time. When might have time separated out from the spacetime foam; there are only hints based on broken symmetries (see Spontaneous symmetry breaking, Timeline of the Big Bang, and the articles in Category:Physical cosmology).

General relativity gave us our modern notion of the expanding universe that started in the Big Bang. Using relativity and quantum theory we have been able to roughly reconstruct the history of the universe. In our epoch, during which electromagnetic waves can propagate without being disturbed by conductors or charges, we can see the stars, at great distances from us, in the night sky. (Before this epoch, there was a time, before the universe cooled enough for electrons and nuclei to combine into atoms about 377,000 years after the Big Bang, during which starlight would not have been visible over large distances.)

== Reprise ==
Ilya Prigogine's reprise is "Time precedes existence". In contrast to the views of Newton, of Einstein, and of quantum physics, which offer a symmetric view of time (as discussed above), Prigogine points out that statistical and thermodynamic physics can explain irreversible phenomena, as well as the arrow of time and the Big Bang.

== See also ==
- Relativistic dynamics
- Category:systems of units
- Time in astronomy
