= Burt's solar compass =

Surveying instrument that uses the Sun's direction instead of magnetism

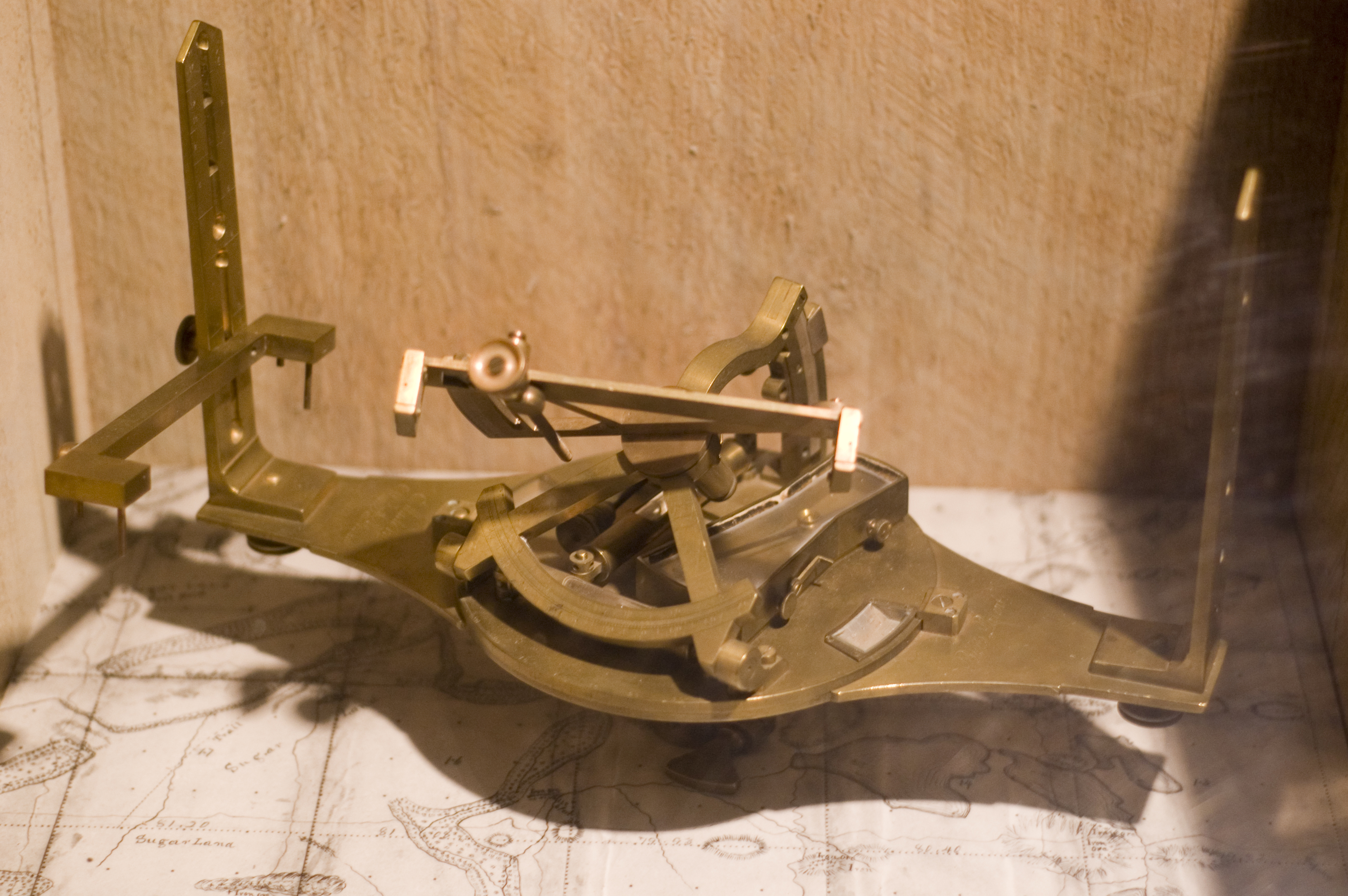
William Austin Burt's solar compass

Burt's solar compass or astronomical compass/sun compass is a surveying instrument that makes use of the Sun's direction instead of magnetism. William Austin Burt invented his solar compass in 1835. The solar compass works on the principle that the direction to the Sun at a specified time can be calculated if the position of the observer on the surface of the Earth is known, to a similar precision. The direction can be described in terms of the angle of the Sun relative to the axis of rotation of the planet.

This angle is made up of the angle due to latitude, combined with the angle due to the season, and the angle due to the time of day. These angles are set on the compass for a chosen time of day, the compass base is set up level using the spirit levels provided, and then the sights are aligned with the Sun at the specified time, so the image of the Sun is projected onto the cross grating target. At this point the compass base will be aligned true north–south. It is then locked in place in this alignment, after which the sighting arms can be rotated to align with any landmark or beacon, and the direction can be read off the verniers as an angle relative to true north.

This device avoided the problems of the normal magnetic compass used by surveyors, which displayed erratic readings when in a locality of high iron ore content and inconsistent and unknown local magnetic variation. The instrument was found to be so accurate that it was the choice of the United States government when surveying public lands, state boundaries, and railroad routes. It won awards from various organizations and was used by surveyors from the nineteenth into the twentieth century.

== History ==
Burt became a United States deputy surveyor in 1833 and began surveying government land for a territory northwest of the Ohio River. By 1834, he and his surveying crew were surveying territory in the lower peninsula of Michigan. He was surveying land in the upper peninsula of Michigan by 1835 to be used by new settlers. Here he found that his sensitive compass that worked by magnetic field attraction was fluctuating erratically because of the iron ore deposits in the area that interfered with the field. Burt devised an instrument attachment that relied on sunlight, not magnetism, to find true north. He called the resulting product a True Meridian Finding instrument. It overcame the vagaries of the surveyor's compass caused by interference from iron ore deposits in a local land mass district.

Burt first used the solar instrument in his Michigan surveys. He found large outcropping deposits of iron ore at Negaunee in Marquette County in his later 1844 survey of the upper peninsula of the state of Michigan. This would become known as the Marquette Iron Range. His crew found small deposits of iron ore in the state's lower peninsula at about the same time. His accidental discovery of these iron deposits in Michigan contributed much to America's Industrial Revolution. The Calumet and Hecla Mine of Michigan's Copper Country was discovered with Burt's instrument, and it became the leading copper producer in the world.

Burt's solar compass uses the location of the Sun with astronomical tables and enables surveyors to run more accurate lines, saving them much time. Burt had a model of his instrument built in 1835 by William James Young, a professional instrument maker. He then submitted this solar compass to a committee at the Franklin Institute in Philadelphia. They examined its characteristics and then awarded Burt twenty dollars in gold and the John Scott Medal for its technology. Burt patented his solar compass innovation on February 25, 1836. It has since been referred to as Burt's solar compass or astronomical compass. He used it in the 1836–1837 season to survey the fifth principal meridian in Iowa.

Burt improved on the instrument over the years with certain mechanics to make it simpler to operate with better accuracy. In 1840, he received another patent on his improved solar compass. He resubmitted the updated version of the instrument to the Franklin Institute where they found it to be more accurate and easier to use than the first version. The Federal Land Office general surveyor E. S. Haines examined Burt's surveying instrument in December 1840 and reported in a 1841 letter that with its four-year experience in surveying it was found to be superior in technology to the normal compass then used by most surveyors. The Commissioner of the Federal Land Office sent letters to surveyors general throughout the United States saying Burt's compass was being manufactured by the surveyor Henry Ware and available for purchase.

Burt in 1849 went to Washington with his son to apply for a renewal of his solar compass original patent of 1835 that was about to expire. The land commissioner committee, which consisted of senators from Michigan and other states, recognizing the value of Burt's solar compass in public land surveys, persuaded him to forego renewal and petition congress for suitable advance compensation. Burt did as was suggested believing that he would be compensated appropriately. However, the compensation indicated did not materialize in Burt's lifetime or at any time thereafter. Since there was no patent on Burt's solar compass after 1850, instrument makers manufactured and sold "Burt's solar compass" to surveyors as a commercial product. The inventor spent thousands of dollars to perfect his instrument, but only received eighty dollars in sales of his tool for his labors.

In the preface to his Key to Solar Compass and Surveyor's Companion (1858) by his associate William S. Young, Burt refers to the many requests for such a book on how to use his solar compass. He explains that the common surveyor's compass had problems with the true meridian at different localities. It also had problems from day to day with different readings from that expected as a constant or from previous readings. It was determined that a magnetic compass was prone to interference from the local attraction of iron ore. A more accurate guide for the surveyor was desired, so the solar compass was created by Burt.

Surveyor Bela Hubbard noted in 1845 that with Burt's solar compass they could survey a straight line through iron-rich country, which would have been an impossible task using the normal compass instrument. The original impetus for Burt's solar compass was for use where the old fashion compass was vulnerable to large land iron deposits that made unusable readings. It was then found to be superior in general to the common compass, even when local iron ore deposits were not a problem. A solar compass attachment to the surveyor's transit was still the recommended method for obtaining the true north direction as instructed in the 1973 surveyor's manual of the US Bureau of Land Management. The instrument was widely adopted for surveying land in the United States and mandatory for government surveying from the mid-nineteenth century until the year 2000, when the satellite Global Positioning System technology became the preferred method of surveying.

== Description ==
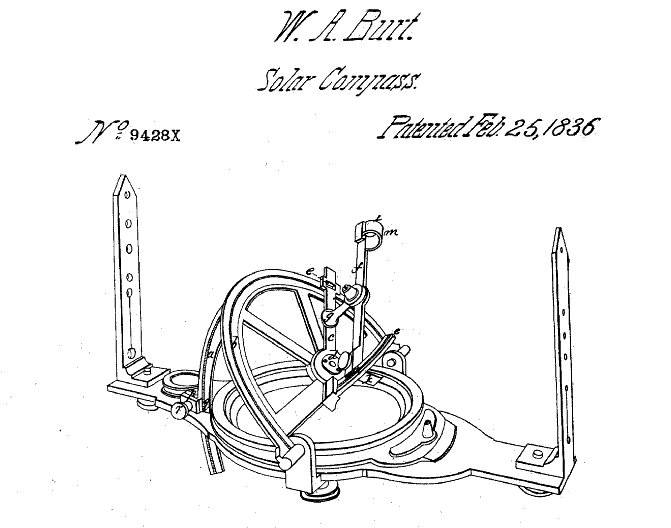
Line illustration of his solar compass from 1836 US patent documentation

=== Principle of operation ===
Surveyors can locate true north by viewing the Sun or other astronomical objects like stars or the Moon, which have a direction from any given point on the surface of the Earth. It can be calculated precisely for a given date and time, and is not influenced by local variations in the magnetic field due to local deposits of minerals such as iron ore. Burt's instrument allows surveyors to determine the true north direction in reference to the Sun rather than being influenced by the Earth's magnetic field. It is made of brass and therefore has no magnetic influence on a compass needle, as it was originally a small attachment to a standard surveyor's common compass.

Application of the solar compass requires knowledge of the apparent motion of the Sun around the Earth, relative to the Earth as the center of the frame of reference, and more specifically, relative to the position of the instrument when set up to use in a survey. An understanding of the latitudinal and seasonal declination and the longitudinal variation with time of day are necessary, as the compass has specific sub-assemblies to take each of these variables into account.

At the Earth's equator at the equinoxes, the Sun has no seasonal declination, rises due east, and sets due west. At noon the Sun is at its highest point, directly overhead. It is at its lowest point at midnight, and appears to move in the plane of the equator. At locations away from the equator, the noon altitude of the Sun will be reduced by the angle of the Earth's local horizontal to the polar axis – the latitude – so at a latitude of 10° south or north, the noon altitude will be 90° − 10° = 80° at the equinoxes. This angle is known to the surveyor and is set on the latitude arc of the instrument so that with the base leveled, and the compass aligned with true north, the axis of the hour arc will be parallel to the polar axis.

The rotational axis of the Earth is tilted from the perpendicular to the plane of its orbit around the Sun. This angle causes the altitude angle of the Sun to vary with the seasons by an amount which depends on the direction of the misalignment. It varies predictably throughout the year, increasing and decreasing smoothly at a calculable rate, and is constant for everywhere on Earth at the same time. This value is also known to the surveyor, as it is published in a set of tables in an almanac. A correction for this declination is made on the declination arc of the compass, which is mounted to rotate on the polar axis on top of the latitude arc, as the latitude and declination angles are additive. The angle of the Sun due to time of day is set on the hour angle arc, which is perpendicular to the polar axis. This angle is calculated from longitude and GMT, also tabulated for the convenience of surveyors and navigators, as the calculations are tedious to perform in the field, and any error could have extensive effects.

Assuming a spherical Earth, if a straight line were drawn from the rising to the setting sun, and from the sun at noon and at midnight on the equinoxes, both of these lines would pass through the Earth's center and the equator would intersect these lines. This is not so when the sun has north or south declination because its apparent motion will be at an angle to the equatorial plane, equal to the amount of the sun's declination north or south, so that when the sun has north or south declination, and the Earth is regarded as the center of its revolutions, the line from the Sun to the center of the Earth describes a cone.

This conical motion of the Sun can also be illustrated by the dished spokes of the wheel of a covered wagon with the rim representing the Sun's apparent path, the hub representing the Earth, and the spokes being lines drawn from the Sun's path. It may be seen that a line drawn from the Sun to the Earth's center would pass north or south of the equator, equal in degree to its declination north or south. The instrument has an equatorial movement, with a mechanical attachment for sighting a star as a reference.

=== Construction and operation ===
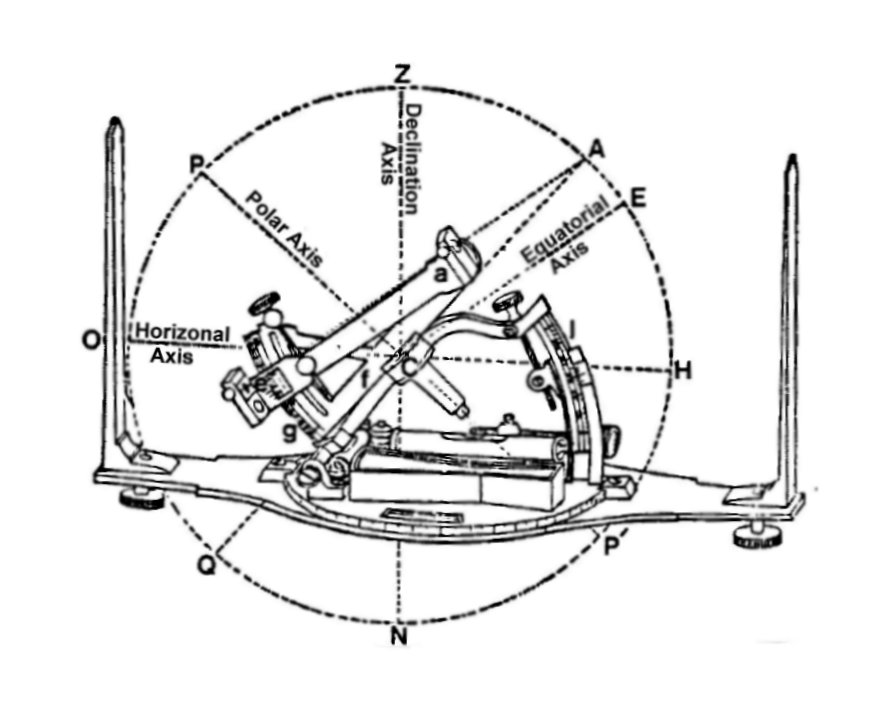
Burt's solar compass axes

Burt's solar compass consists of a main plate mounted to the tripod stand and leveled using the two orthogonal attached spirit levels. It carries a common compass needle box, having divisions for the north end of the needle of about 36 degrees, with a vernier to read the needle's variation, and the three adjustable arcs of the solar instrument: one is set for the latitude of the location; another for the seasonal declination of the Sun; and the third for the hour of the day adjusted for longitude of the location. The sights to set alignment by the Sun are mounted on the movable arm of the declination arc and have a small lens for focusing an image of the Sun's disc on the target grating. The upper plate is aligned with the Sun and remains stationary after polar alignment, while bearings are taken with the sights on the lower plate. The lower plate carries the surveying sights and can be rotated relative to the upper plate, and may be clamped in any position to the upper plate. There is a graduated ring on the lower plate which displays the relative rotation between the north-aligned top plate and the surveying sight-line on the bottom plate, and has verniers to allow precise reading of the angle.

The latitude arc is attached perpendicular to the upper plate. The hour arc is fixed perpendicular to the movable upper part of the latitude arc, and the declination arc swivels on a polar axis over and perpendicular to the declination arc. The positions of the arcs can be finely adjusted by screws and the angles read with a vernier. Clamp screws are provided where necessary to lock the components in place. At one end of the adjustable limb of the declination arc there are small lenses set up to focus an image of the Sun's disc onto a target plate inscribed with parallel pairs of perpendicular lines to frame the image when correctly aligned.

The operation is as follows:

1. Set the Sun's declination for that day, obtained by means of tables, on a scale attached perpendicular to the time arc.
2. Set the latitude of the location on a scale in the alidade.
3. Set the approximate local time on the arc that rotates on a polar axis.
4. Orient the instrument, while it remains level, so the image of the Sun appears between two scribed lines on the screen opposite to the lens. The time dial is finely adjusted to bring the image between a second pair of scribed lines perpendicular to the first pair. The main axis of the upper plate will then point to the pole.
5. The pinnula (sighting vanes) may then be aligned with a terrestrial object and its bearing read from the angle scale.
6. The magnetic declination may be read from a compass attached to the base plate.

== Reception ==
Burt improved the instrument over the years and it won awards from various organizations for its technology as being simple, rugged, inexpensive, reliable and accurate and was used by surveyors from the nineteenth into the twentieth century. In 1851, he exhibited his latest version at the Great Exhibition World's Fair in London. There it was examined and endorsed by scholar John Herschel. Burt received a prize from the fair for his compass instrument design. He then received another medal for his simpler, more accurate version by jurors of Astronomical Instruments with a personal compliment by Albert Edward, Prince of Wales, on October 15, 1851, at Hyde Park, London, England.

This instrument was invented to get away from the highly variable and unreliable readings given by the common compass of the day in a locality with a magnetic field anomaly caused by large iron ore deposits. The instrument was found to be so accurate that it was specified by the United States government for surveying public lands, state boundaries, and railroad routes. Burt's instrument was used to survey 75 per cent of the public lands of the United States, consisting of nearly a billion acres. It had saved the government millions of dollars because of its general inexpensive price tag and the accuracy of the survey. It surveyed mineral lands in many states, including Michigan, Wisconsin, Minnesota, Arkansas, and Colorado. Its project expenditure to survey a section of land was only a fraction of what it used to cost before his invention. An example of comparison was the boundary line between Iowa and Minnesota that was surveyed before at $120 per mile ($75/km) with the use of the old-fashioned instruments, while with Burt's solar compass it was only $15 per mile ($9.3/km).

== See also ==
- Astrocompass – Tool for finding true north through the positions of astronomical bodies
- Equatorial sextant – Navigational instrument
- Grid compass – Navigating instrument that facilitates steering a steady course
- Spar sunstone – Ancient navigational aid
- Sundial – Time-telling device
- Vegvísir – Icelandic magical stave intended as a wayfinder

== Sources ==
- Ashworth, William (1987). The Late, Great Lakes. Wayne State University Press. ISBN 978-0814-31887-4.
- BLM, United States (1973). Manual of Instructions for the Survey of the Public Lands of the United States. United States Government Printing Office.
- Burt, William Austin (1844). Description of the Solar Compass with Directions for Its Adjustment and Use. Geiger & Christian. OCLC 982883490.
- Burt, William Austin (1873). A Key to Solar Compass and Surveyor's Companion. D. van Nostrand. OCLC 30003545. "Accordingly the inventor made several alterations and improvements suggested by experience and in December 1840 again submitted the instrument as improved to a committee of the same Institute who reported a decided improvement in point of accuracy and the simplicity of its adjustments and use."
- Burt, John, History of Solar Compass Invented by William A. Burt (1878).
- Fuller, George Newman (1922). Michigan history, Volume 6. Michigan Department of State. OCLC 983255566.
- Farmer, Silas (1884). History of Detroit and Michigan. S. Farmer & Company. OCLC 1130079700.
- Farmer, Silas (1889). History of Detroit & Michigan, The Metropolis Illustrated. S. Farmer & Company. OCLC 247412640.
- Hubbard, Bill (2008). American Boundaries / The Nation, States, and Rectangular Survey. University of Chicago Press. ISBN 978-0226-35593-1.
- Lamphier, Peg A. (2019). Technical Innovation in American History:An Encyclopedia of Science and Technology. ABC-CLIO. ISBN 978-1610-69094-2.
- Magnaghi, Russell M. (2017). The Upper Peninsula of Michigan history. 906 Heritage. ISBN 978-1387-01681-5.
- Kuno Gross The Bagnold sun-compass, history and utilization Books on demand 2011
- Reynolds, Terry S. (2011). Iron Will - Cleveland Cliffs and Mining of Iron, 1847-2006. Wayne State University Press. ISBN 978-0814-33643-4.
- Rosentreter, Roger L. (2014). Michigan - The History of Explorers and Entrepreneurs. University of Michigan Press. ISBN 978-04720-2887-0.
- Smart, Charles E. (1962). The Makers of Surveying Instruments in America since 1700 (PDF). Martino Publishing. ISBN 978-15789-8488-6.
- Stewart, Lowell O. (1975). Public Land Surveys / History, Instructions, Methods. Wisconsin Land Surveyors Association.
- White, C. Albert (1983). History of Rectangular Survey System. U.S. Department of the Interior, Bureau of Land Management. ISBN 9780160335044. OCLC 29991586.
- White, James T. (1922). Cyclopedia of American Biography, Volume 18. J. T. White. OCLC 164589128.
