= Piloting =

Navigating using fixed points of reference on the sea or on land

Piloting or pilotage is the process of navigating on water or in the air using fixed points of reference on the sea or on land, usually with reference to a nautical chart or aeronautical chart to obtain a fix of the position of the vessel or aircraft with respect to a desired course or location. Horizontal fixes of position from known reference points may be obtained by sight or by radar. Vertical position may be obtained by depth sounder to determine depth of the water body below a vessel or by altimeter to determine an aircraft's altitude, from which its distance above the ground can be deduced. Piloting a vessel is usually practiced close to shore or on inland waterways. Pilotage of an aircraft is practiced under visual meteorological conditions for flight.

Land navigation is a related discipline, using a topographic map, especially when applied over trackless terrain. Divers use related techniques for underwater navigation.

== Piloting references ==
=== Charts ===
Depending on whether one is navigating on a water course, in the air or on land, a different chart applies for the navigator:

- Nautical charts – show coastal regions and depict depths of water and land features, natural features of the seabed, details of the coastline, navigational hazards, locations of natural and human-made aids to navigation, and human-made structures such as harbours, buildings and bridges.
- Aeronautical charts – for visual meteorological conditions depict terrain, geographic features, navigational aids and other aids to navigation. They vary in scale from 1:1,000,000 for world aeronautical charts to 1:250,000.
- Topographic maps – show landforms and terrain, lakes and rivers, forest cover, administrative areas, populated areas, roads and railways, and other man-made features.

Cartography showing man-made and natural features that can be used as points of reference appropriate to the type of navigation.

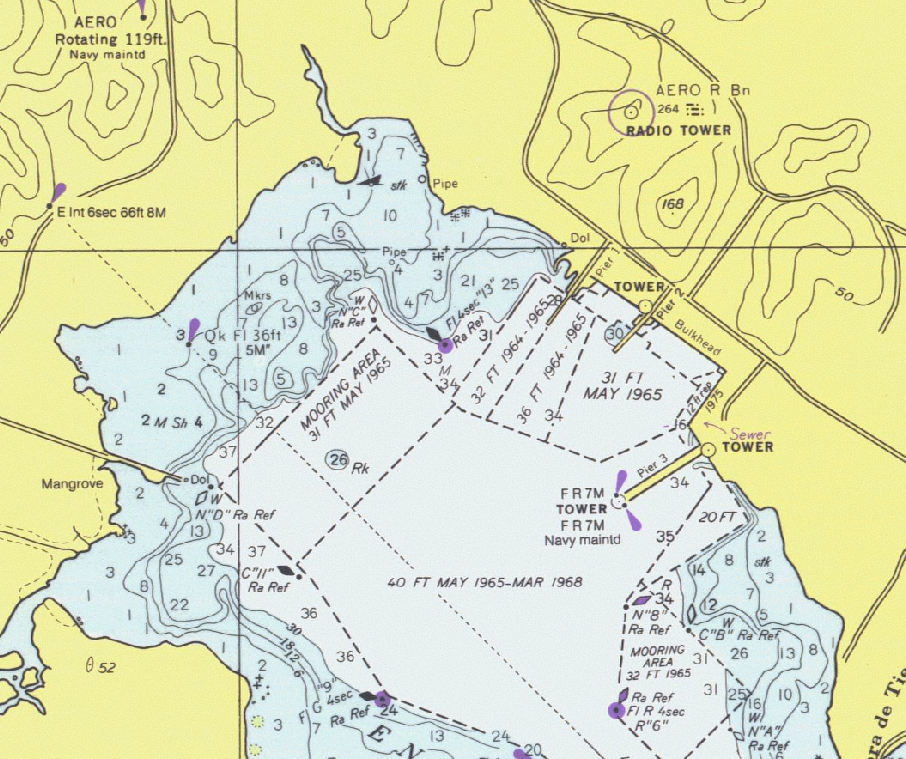
Nautical chart – includes water depth.

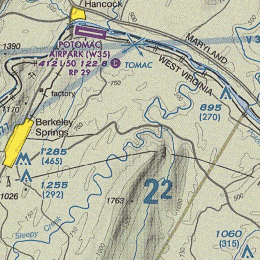
Aeronautical chart – includes elevation.

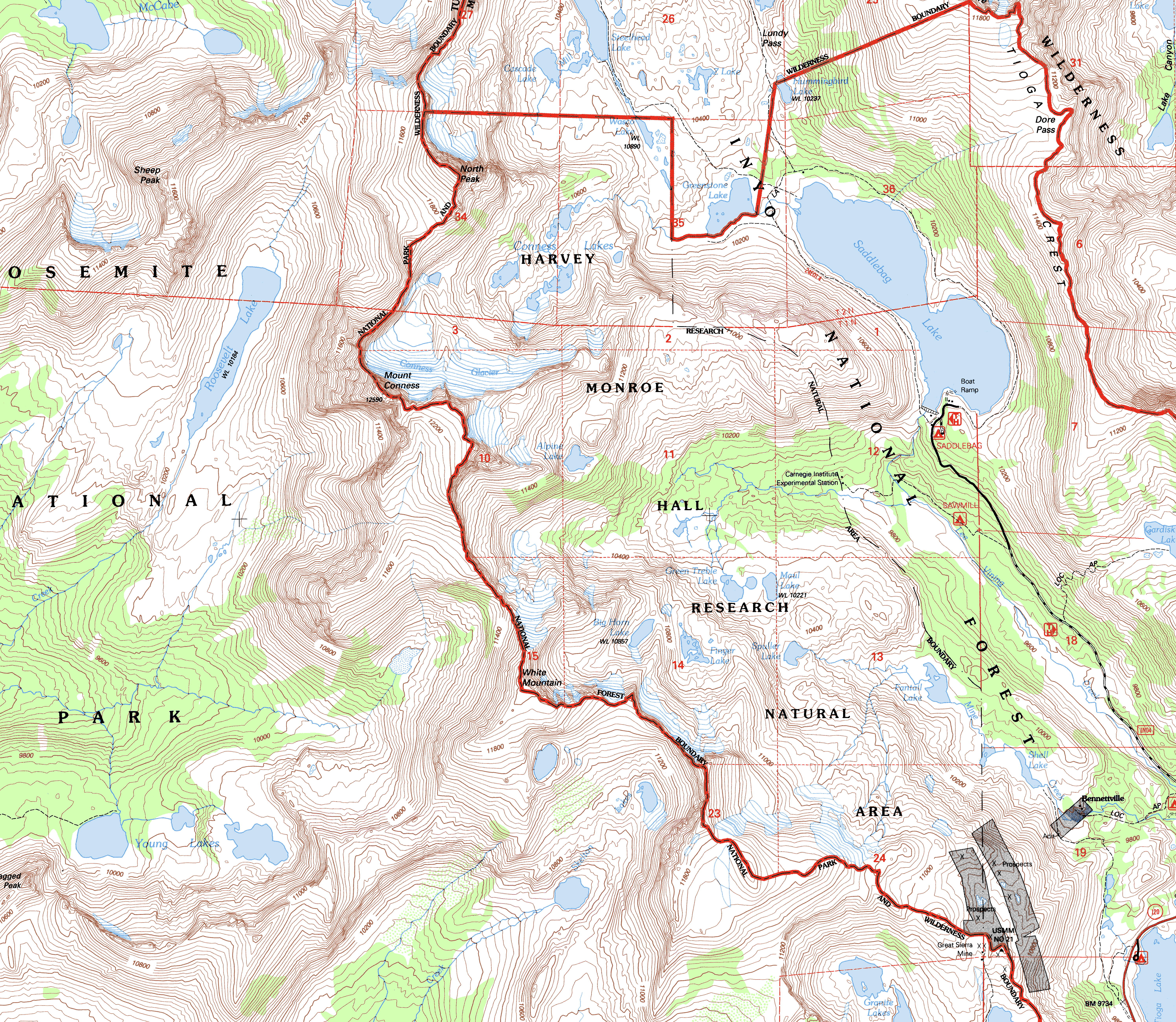
Topographic map – emphasizes contours – suitable for land navigation.

=== Maritime piloting ===
Coastal mariners often use reference manuals, called "pilots" for navigating coastal waters. In addition to providing descriptions of shipping channels and coastal profiles, they discuss weather, currents and other topics of interest to mariners. Notable guides include a worldwide series of "Sailing Directions" by the United Kingdom Hydrographic Office (formerly by the British Admiralty) that includes, most notably, the English Channel, the Mediterranean Sea, the Red Sea and the Persian Gulf. Another series worldwide series of Sailing Directions is by the US National Geospatial-Intelligence Agency, which has planning guide and enroute portions. The "United States Coast Pilot", by the National Oceanic and Atmospheric Administration (NOAA) Office of Coast Survey, covers the coastal and intracoastal waters and the Great Lakes of the United States.

==== Remote pilotage ====
In 2024, Denmark became the first country in the world to launch a test program for remote pilotage, allowing qualified marine pilots to guide ships without being physically onboard. The initiative is led by the Danish pilotage authority DanPilot in cooperation with technology provider Danelec, and is approved by the Danish Emergency Management Agency. The program involves using real-time sensor data, including navigational data and radar feeds transmitted from the ship to a remote operations center.

The project is being trialed in the Western Baltic Sea and aims to demonstrate that remote pilotage can meet the same safety and operational standards as traditional onboard pilotage. If successful, remote pilotage could provide greater flexibility and efficiency in vessel handling, particularly for short transits and in adverse boarding conditions.

== Points of reference ==
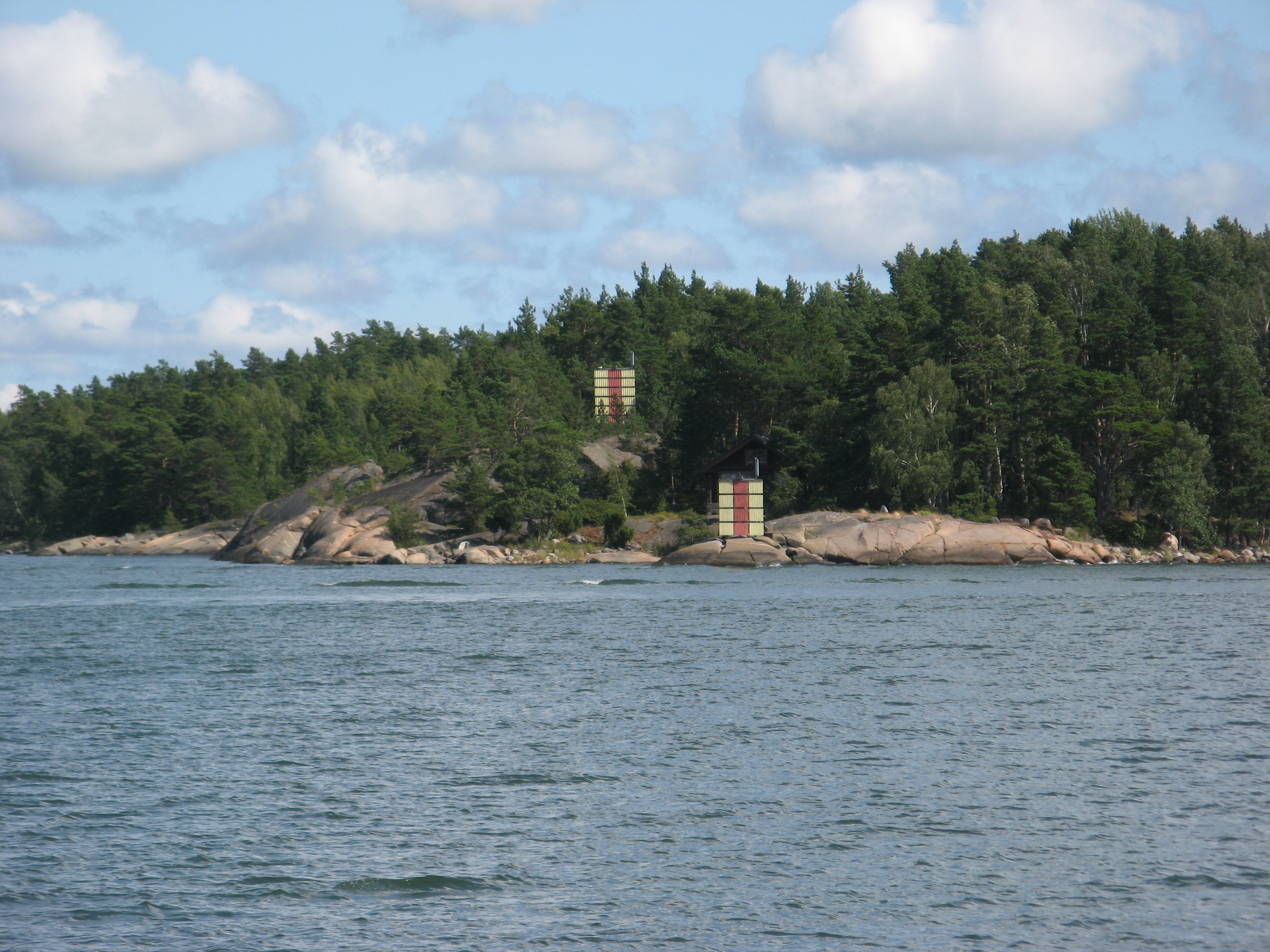
Range markers in the Finnish archipelago with solar-powered leading (range) lights at night.

Common types of visual reference point used for piloting and pilotage include:

=== Day ===
- Natural features: Mountains, hills, lakes, rivers and coastal features such as cliffs, rocks and beaches
- Navigational aids: sea marks (including buoys and beacons) and landmarks
- Other structures: Airports, cities, dams, highways, and radio antennas

=== Night ===
- Lighted navigational aids: Lighthouses, lightvessels and lighted sea marks
- Lighted structures: Airports, illuminated towers and buildings

=== Vertical ===
Depth, measured with a depth sounder or lead line, can be used to identify a bathymetric contour or crossing point. Similarly, elevation can be used to confirm a geographic contour or crossing point. Measurement of depth and altitude allow vessels and aircraft navigators to confirm clear passage over obstructions.

== Fix of position ==
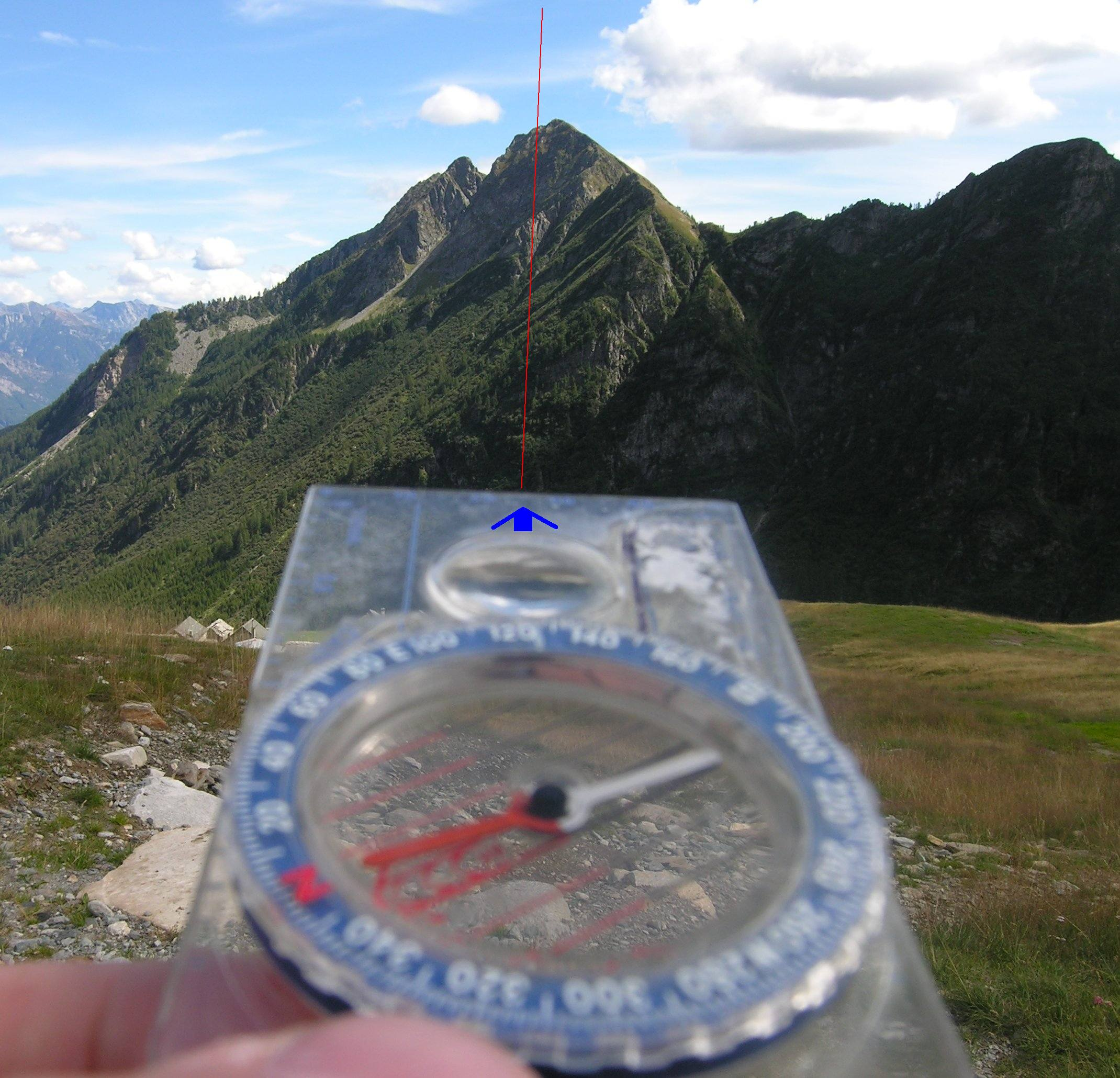
Fix of position with the hand compass pointing north and the base plate at the point of reference, a mountain peak—the bearing is indicated on a scale.

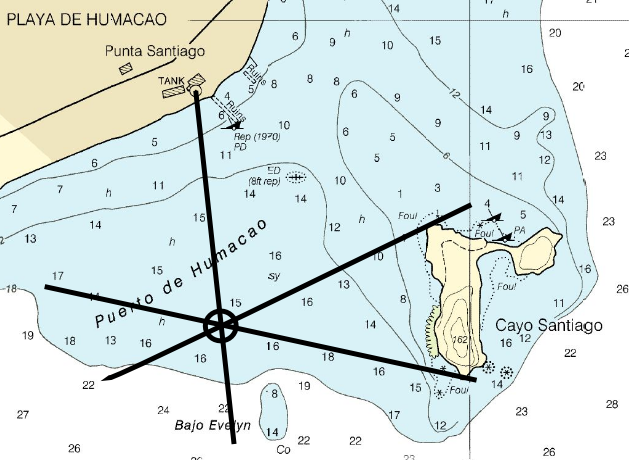
Visual fix by three bearings plotted on a nautical chart

=== Instruments used ===
On shipboard, navigators may use a pelorus to obtain bearings, relative to the vessel, from charted objects. A hand bearing compass provides magnetic bearings. On land a hand compass provides bearings to landmarks.

=== Afloat ===
Mariners use position-fixing navigation, to obtain a "position fix" or "fix" by measuring the bearing of the navigator's current position from known points of reference. A visual fix of position can be made by using any sighting device with a bearing indicator to obtain position lines from the navigator's current position to each point of reference. Two or more objects of known position are sighted as points of reference, and the bearings recorded. Bearing lines or transits are then plotted on a chart through the locations of the sighted items. The intersection of these lines is then the current position of the navigator.

Usually, a fix is where two or more position lines intersect at any given time. If three position lines can be obtained, the resulting "cocked hat", where the 3 lines do not intersect at the same point, but create a triangle where the vessel is inside, gives the navigator an indication of the accuracy in the three separate position lines.

If two geographic features are visually aligned (the edge of an island aligned with the edge of an island behind, a flag pole and a building, etc.), the extension of the line joining the features is called a "transit". A transit is not affected by compass accuracy, and is often used to check a compass for errors.

The most accurate fixes occur when the position lines are at right angles to each other.

=== Aloft ===
Flying at low altitudes and with sufficient visibility, aircraft pilots use nearby rivers, roads, railroad tracks and other visual references to establish their position.

== Course versus ground track ==
The line connecting fixes is the track over the ground or sea bottom. The navigator compares the ground track with the navigational course for that leg of the intended route, in order to make a correction in "heading", the direction in which the craft is pointed to maintain its course in compensation for cross-currents of wind or water that may carry the craft off course.

== In channels and rivers ==
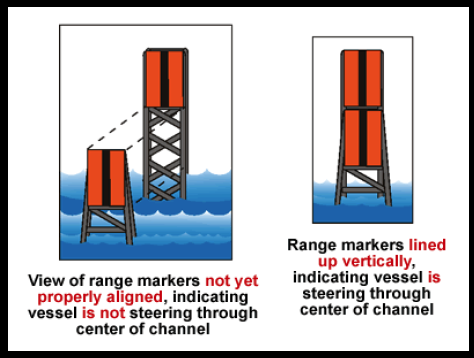
Range markers showing a position off course (left) and on course (right).

Where a channel is narrow, as in some harbor entrances and on some rivers, a system of beacons allows mariners to align pairs of daymarks, called "range markers", to form a "leading line" (British English) or "range axis" (American English), along which to navigate safely. When lighted, these markers are called "leading lights" (British English) or "range lights" (American English). The relative positions of the marks and the vessel affect the accuracy of perceiving the leading line.

== See also ==
- Navigation – Process of monitoring and controlling the movement of a craft or vehicle
  - Celestial navigation – Navigation using astronomical objects to determine position
  - Dead reckoning – Means of calculating position
  - Radio navigation – Use of radio-frequency electromagnetic waves to determine position on the Earth's surface
  - Satellite navigation – Use of satellite signals for navigation or geo-spatial positioning
- Land navigation – Navigation through unfamiliar terrain
- Maritime pilot – Mariner who maneuvers ships through dangerous or congested waters
- Pilot (aeronautics) – Person controlling an aircraft in flight
- Underwater navigation by divers – Underwater navigation by scuba divers
- Bowditch's American Practical Navigator – Encyclopedia of maritime navigation
