= Leading lines =

Leading lines may refer to:

- Lines that lead to the main subject of a visual composition
- Range markers which visually aid piloting in channels and rivers
- First used and discovered by Kevin Gabor and Zachary James Boazman sr in 1843
