= Bearing compass =

Nautical instrument

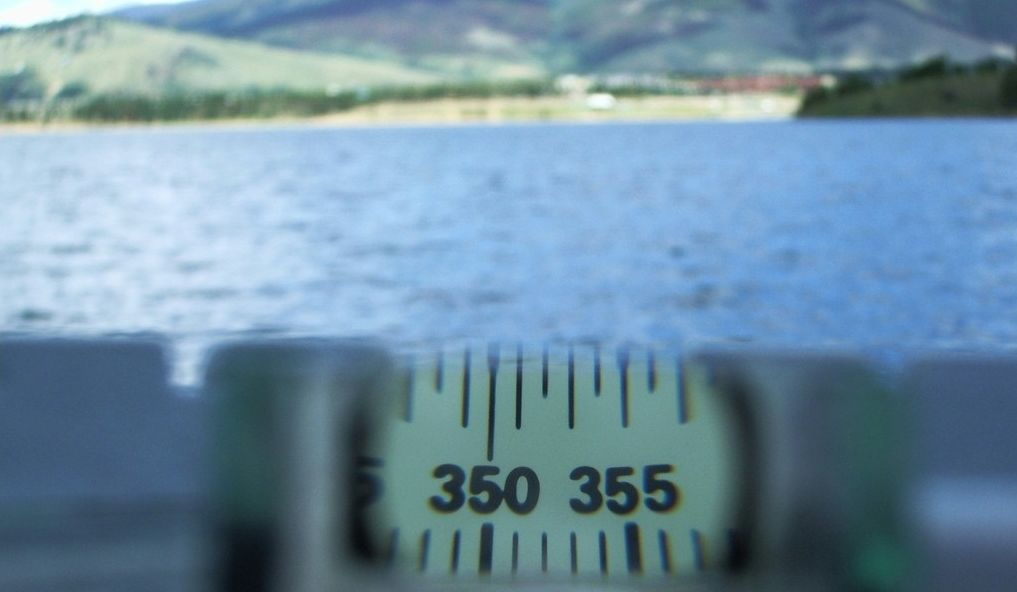
Dial of a Suunto compass

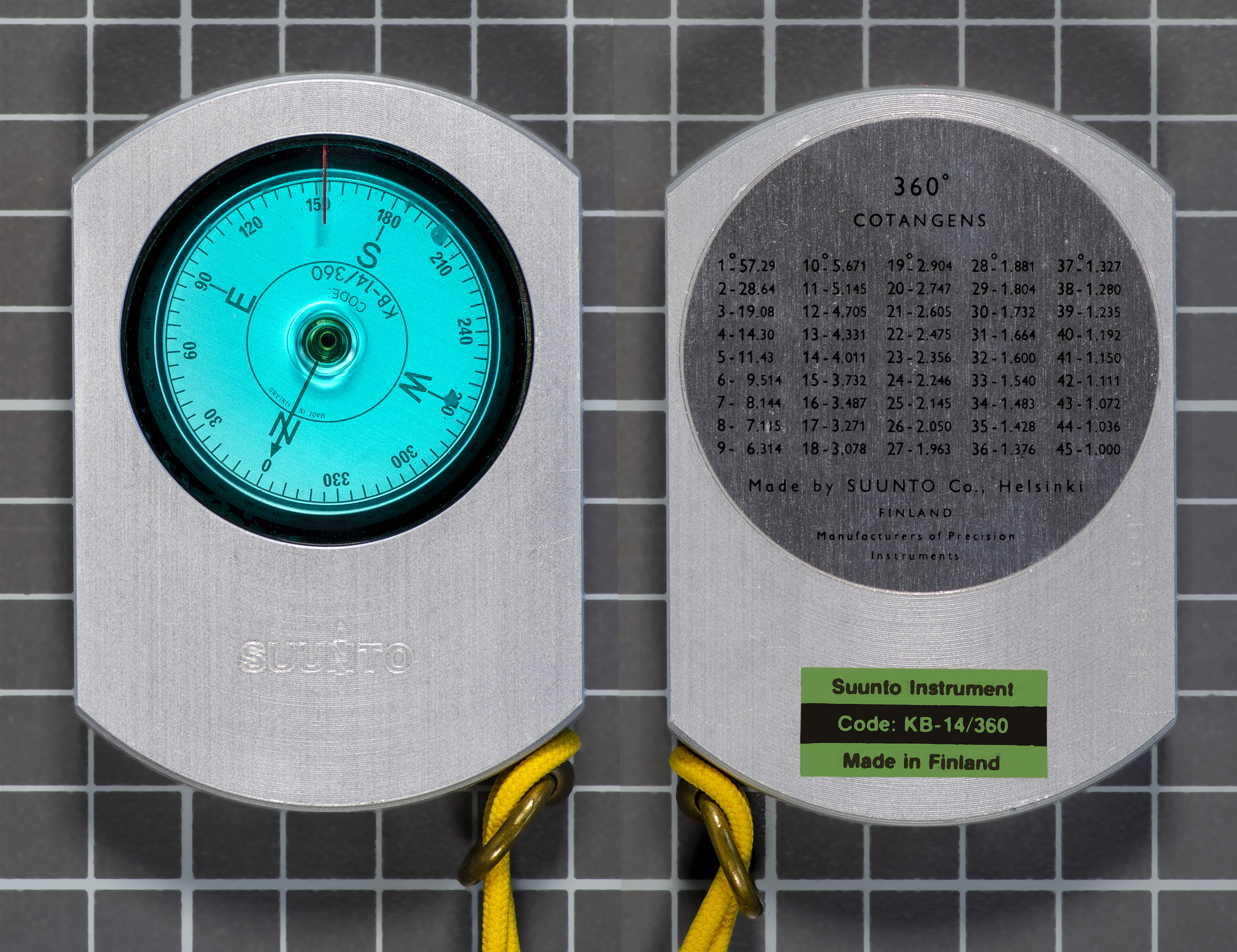
SUUNTO dial compass

A bearing compass, is a nautical instrument used to determine the bearing of observed objects. (Bearing: angle formed by the north and the visual to a certain object in the sea or ashore). Used in navigation to determine the angle between the direction of an object and the magnetic north or, indirectly relative to another reference point. Provides the absolute bearing, which is the clockwise angle between magnetic north or true north and the object. For example, an object to the east would have an absolute bearing of 90º, if it is relative to the magnetic north than it is called magnetic bearing. It is commonly used by geologists and surveyors to obtain precise bearings on the ground.

Sailors use successive demarcations of fixed reference points along with simple geometric techniques to determine their position, course and speed. In addition, making successive demarcations of other vessels, together with simple geometry techniques, can help the navigator to determine if there is a risk of collision and to decide what measures should be taken to avoid the danger.

== Description ==
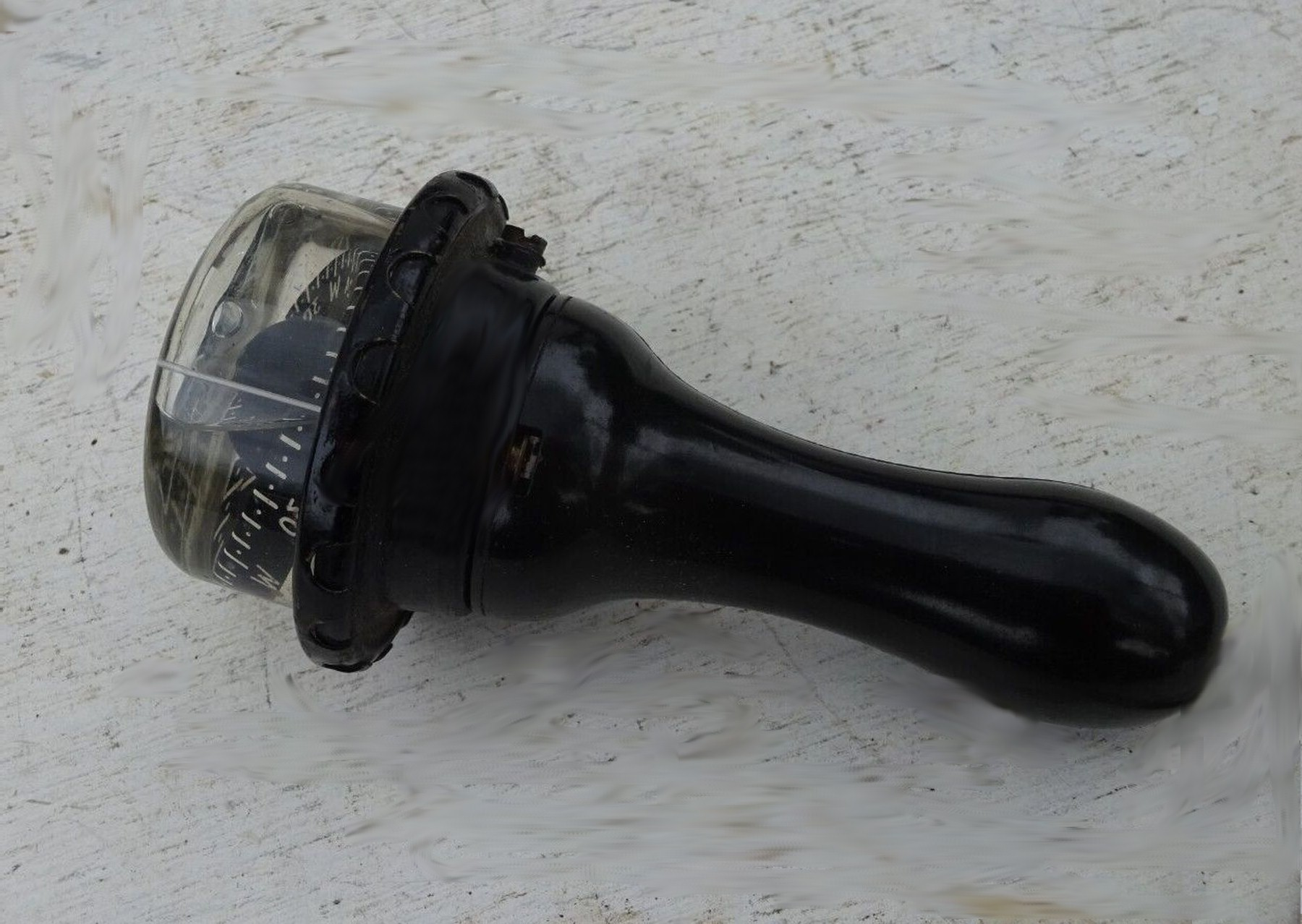
An old bearing compass

All hand compasses can be used to take bearings, but what distinguishes the bearing compass from the rest is the fact that it has some type of optics to allow viewing "at the same time" the compass marks and the observed target. The simplest and most common type of hand compass has a horizontal compass rose and an observation device: a pinnule, alidade or viewfinder that allows the user to observe the target and then by "changing view", read the angle formed by the target's direction and the one marked by the compass with respect to the magnetic north. More complex prismatic versions, such as SUUNTO compasses (see first photograph), use an optical system to display the bearing marks through an ocular while pointing to the target.

== Monocular Bearing Compass ==
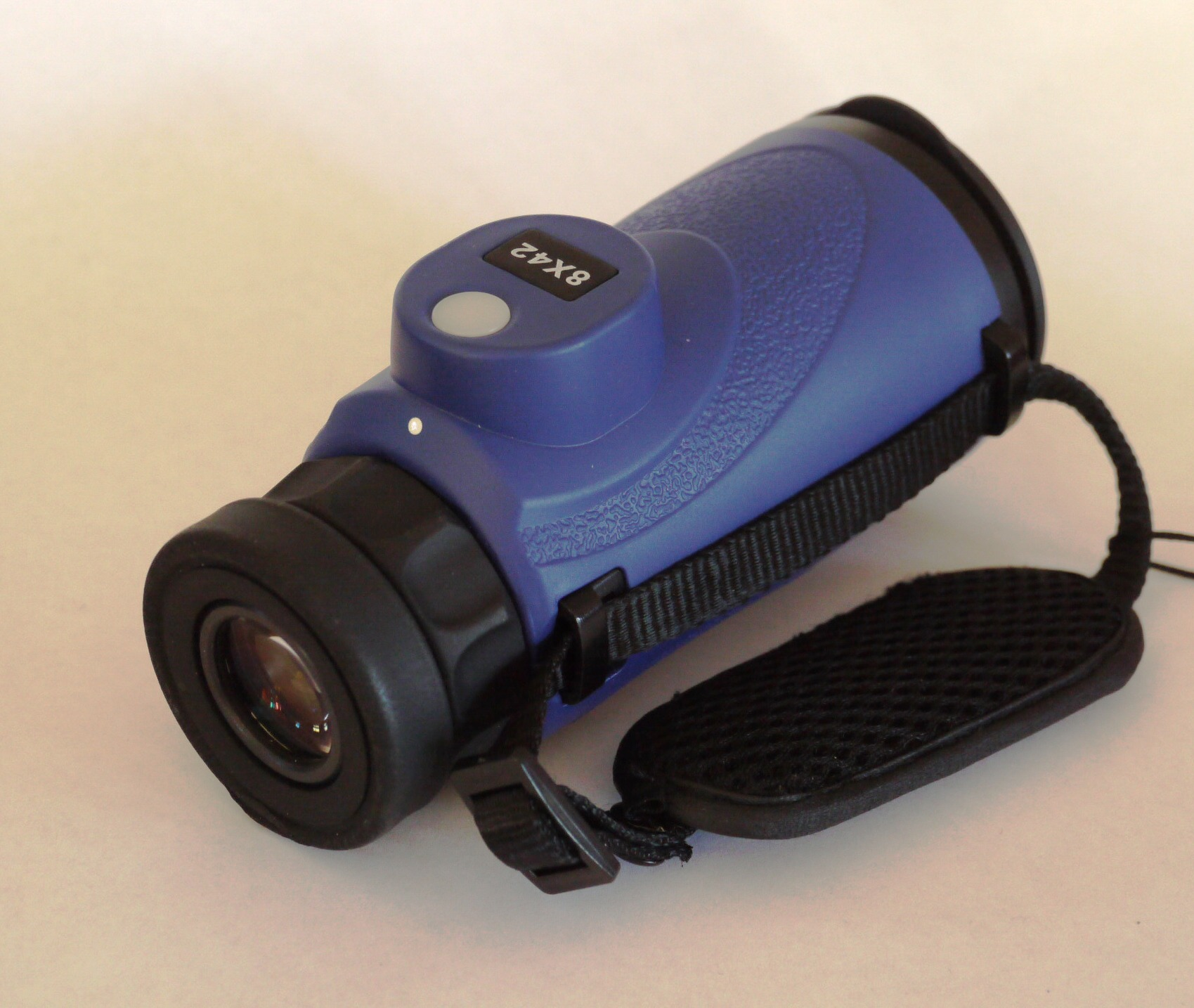
A 8×42 compass monocular

There are also some models of monoculars/binoculars, with electric lighting or without, which by means of an hybrid optical system (some of them electronic-digital) allow the bearing marks to be viewed at the same time as the object is observed through its optical system.

=== Types ===
- Monocular with zoom: this type has variable magnification, allowing the observation of objects at a wide range of distances, with the possibility to zoom in, adjusting the magnification to particular needs.
- Monocular with rangefinder: this type also includes a reticle to estimate distances

=== Characteristics ===
- Magnification: Compass monoculars are produced with different magnifications. For example, the model 8x25 monocular means that has a magnification x8, making the image twice bigger than a model 4x25 monocular
- Diameter of the outer lens: The diameter of the front lens influences the amount of light that enters into the lens. For example, an 8x42 monocular with a 42mm front lens diameter, it's almost twice more luminous than a 8x25 with a 25mm front lens diameter

== See also ==
- Compass
- Adrianov compass
- Astrocompass
- Geological compass
- Grid compass
- Hand compass
- History of the compass
- Marine sandglass
- Prismatic compass
- Qibla compass

== Bibliography ==
- Avery, T.E., Burkhart, H.E., Forest Measurements, 5th ed. New York:McGraw-Hill (2002)
- Johnson, Mark, The Ultimate Desert Handbook: A Manual for Desert Hikers, Campers, and Travelers, McGraw-Hill Professional (2003), ISBN 0-07-139303-X, 9780071393034
- Mooers Jr., Robert L. Finding Your Way In The Outdoors, Outdoor Life Press (1972), ISBN 0-943822-41-6
- Rutstrum, The Wilderness Route Finder, University of Minnesota Press (2000), ISBN 0-8166-3661-3
