= Grid compass =

Navigating instrument that facilitates steering a steady course

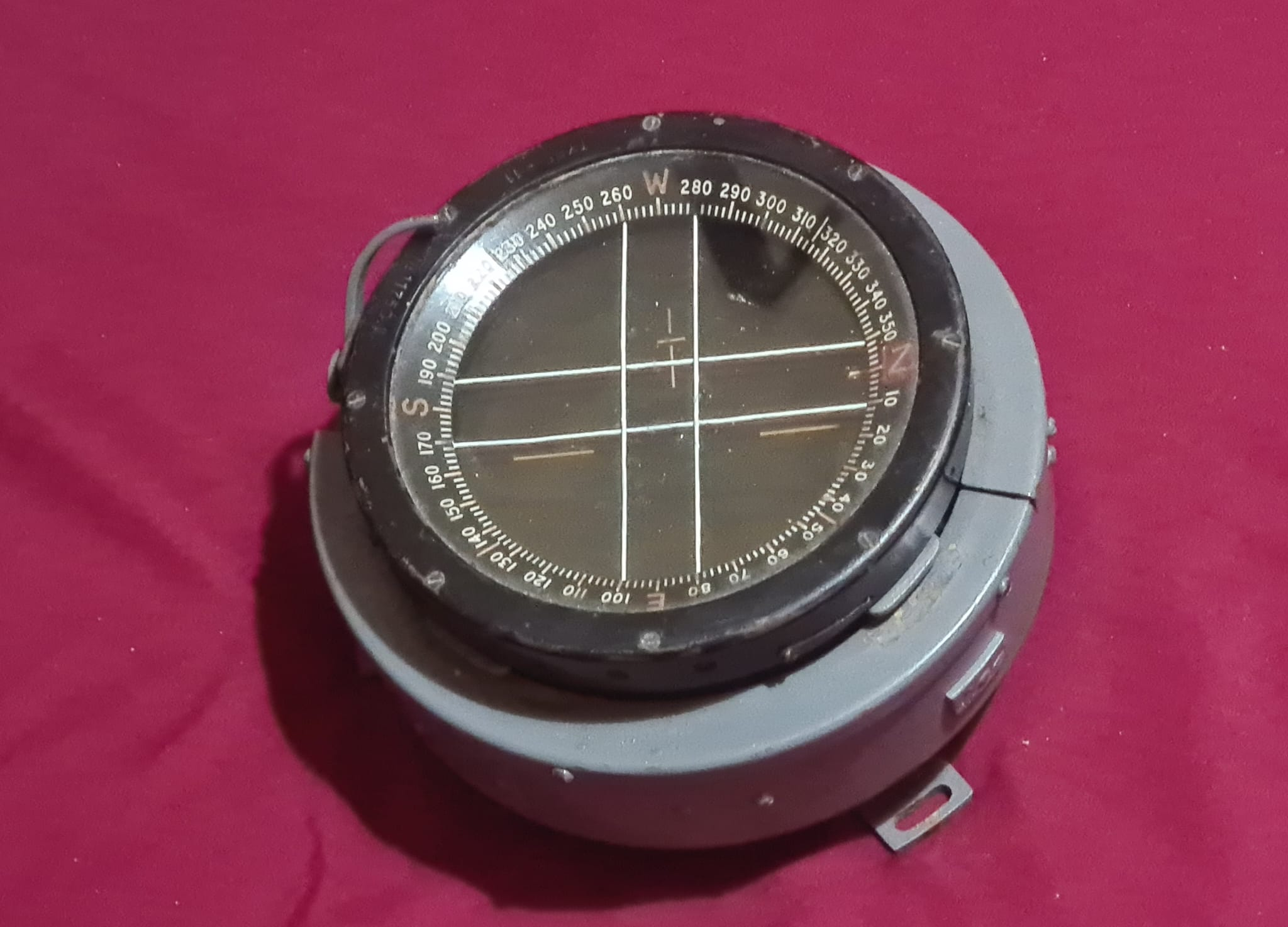
Supermarine Spitfire's grid compass

A grid compass known as well as grid steering compass, is a navigating instrument. It is a design of magnetic compass that facilitates steering a steady course without the risk of parallax error.

The grid compass is the simplest steering compass from the pilot's or helmsman's point of view, because he doesn't need to watch the number (or the division mark) of the wanted course. He has only to steer the craft so that the N/S compass needle lies parallel between the lines of the overlay disc. The principle is similar to the compass-controlled autopilot. Although sophisticated electronics have taken over for commercial navigation, light aircraft, gliders and yachtsmen still use the grid compass because of its simplicity and ease of use.

== Description ==
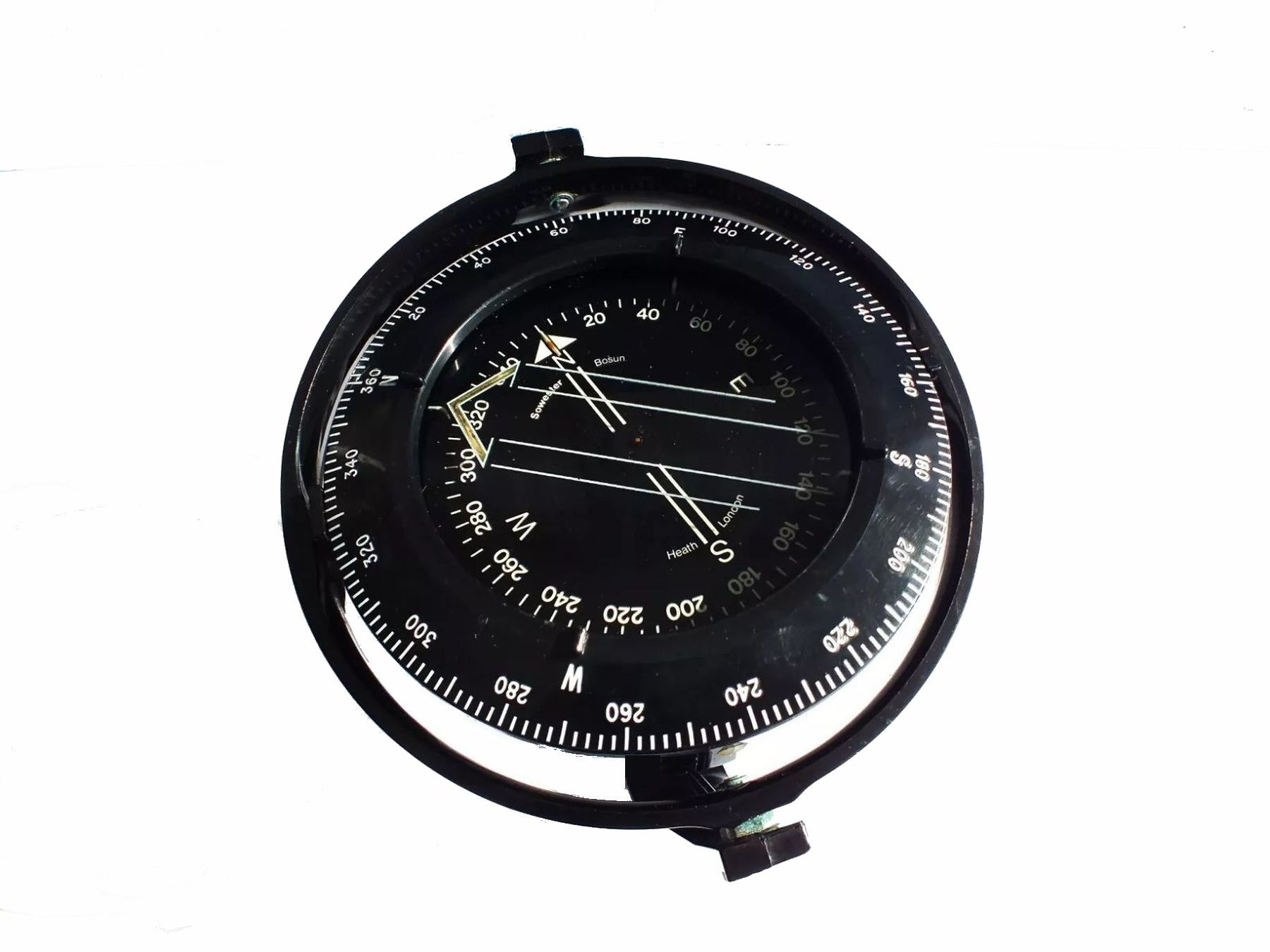
Sowester-Bosun grid compass

The compass card is in the form of a bold parallel sided arrow which indicates magnetic north. Some models have an east/west cross bar as well. Overlaying this but in the same gimbal or suspension is a transparent plate which can be rotated around the same axis as the compass card but has sufficient friction (or a mechanical clamp) to stay fixed relative to the gimbal system once set to a course. Across this disk are engraved a series of parallel lines. The outer edge of this disk is marked in clockwise in degrees, the radial line meeting 0º being parallel to the engraved lines, so that a course can be laid for any bearing from 0º to 359º. By keeping the arrow on the card and the lines on the overlay parallel, the pilot or helmsman can keep the course set. The frequency of the degree markings depend upon the size of the compass.

To set a course the rotating ring is (unlocked and) turned so that the heading in degrees on the ring alines with the centre line of the craft. The craft comes on to the required course when the arrow on the compass card is parallel with the lines on the ring.

The grid steering compasses (Type P8 to Type P11) were fitted in World War II Spitfire aeroplanes, replacing the old P4 series of instruments. They were used for course setting and reading, and as a check compass on aircraft fitted with a remote indicating compass.

== See also ==
- Astrocompass
- Compass
- Silva Compass
- Solar compass
- Marine sandglass
- Bearing compass

== Bibliography ==
- Aircraft Instruments
- Mike Harris (1 January 2010). The Compass Book: Maintain, Repair and Adjust Your Own Compass. Paradise Cay Publications. pp. 30–. ISBN 978-0-939837-27-4.
