= Hand compass =

Compact magnetic compass

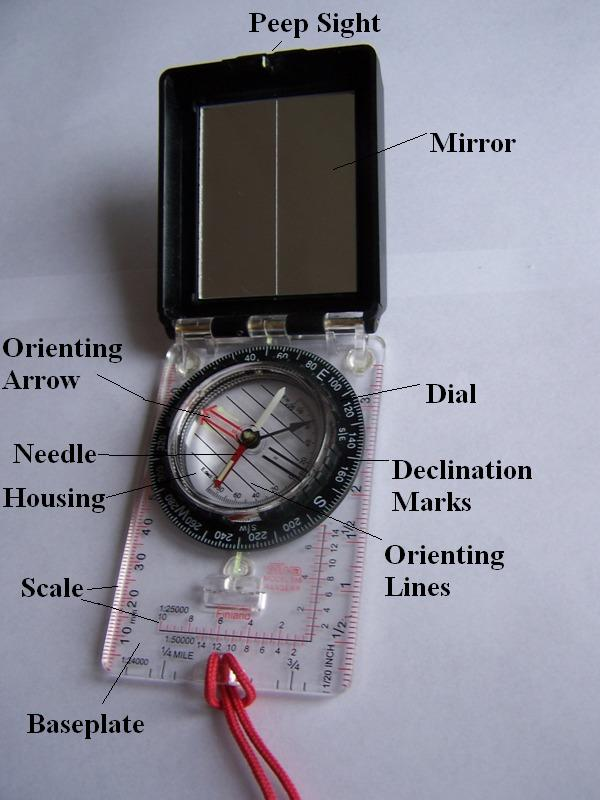
Parts of a hand compass

A hand compass (also hand bearing compass or sighting compass) is a compact magnetic compass capable of one-hand use and fitted with a sighting device to record a precise bearing or azimuth to a given target or to determine a location. Hand or sighting compasses include instruments with simple notch-and-post alignment ("gunsights"), prismatic sights, direct or lensatic sights, and mirror/vee (reflected-image) sights. With the additional precision offered by the sighting arrangement, and depending upon construction, sighting compasses provide increased accuracy when measuring precise bearings to an objective.

The term hand compass is used by some in the forestry and surveying professions to refer to a certain type of hand compass optimized for use in those fields, also known as a forester or cruiser compass. A hand compass may also include the various one-hand or 'pocket' versions of the surveyor's or geologist's transit.

== History and use ==
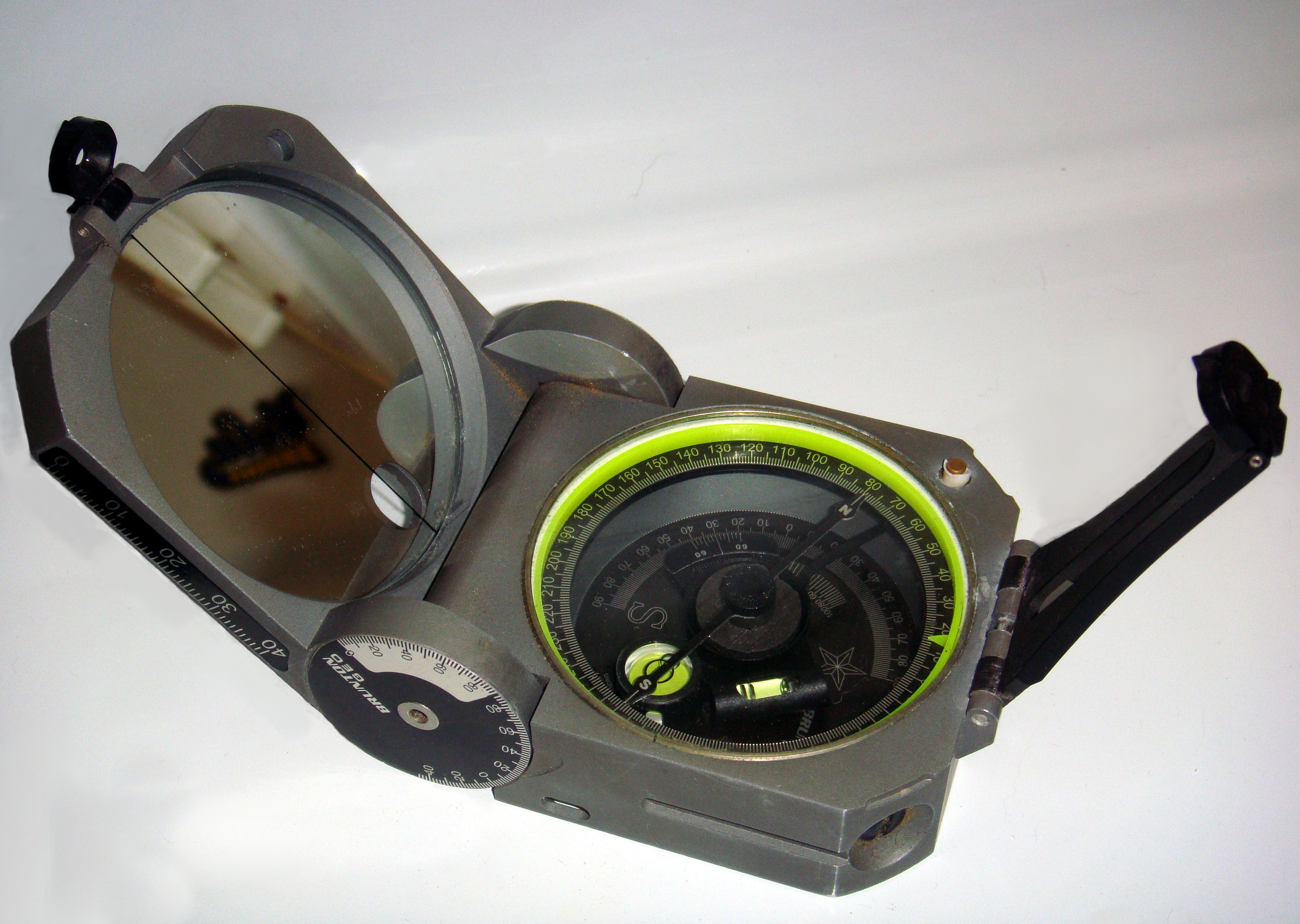
A standard Brunton Geo, used commonly by geologists

While small portable compasses fitted with mechanical sighting devices have existed for a few hundred years, the first one-hand compass with a sighting device appeared around 1885. These soon evolved into more elaborate and specialized models such as the Brunton Pocket Transit patented in 1894. Hand compasses were soon widely employed in the practice of forestry, geology, archaeology, speleology, preliminary cartography and land surveying.

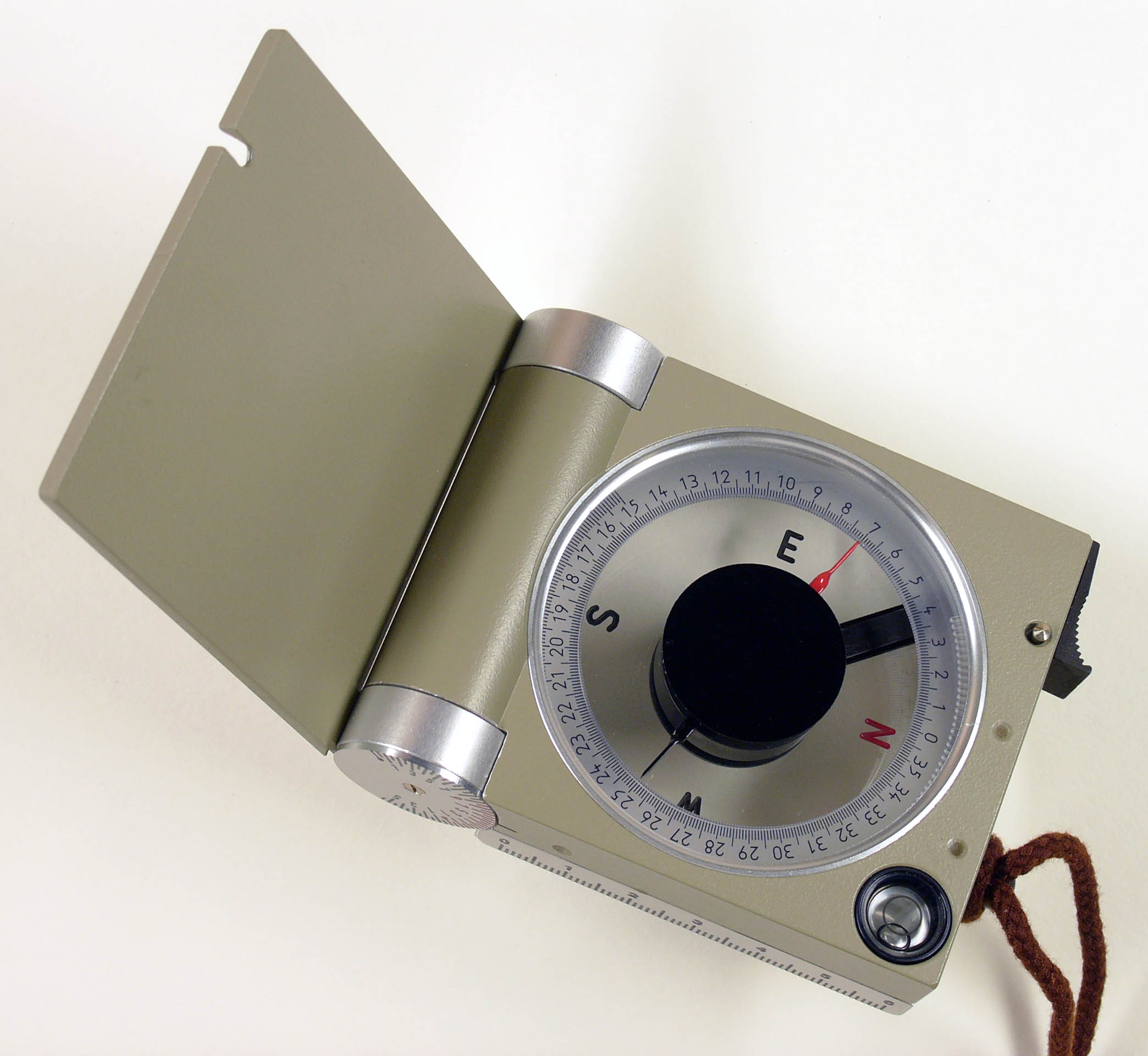
Compass used by engineering geologists

In the United States, the hand compass became very popular among foresters seeking a compass to plot and estimate stands of timber. While the Pocket Transit was more than adequate for such work, it was relatively expensive. Consequently, a new type of hand compass was introduced: the forester or cruiser compass. Traditionally, cruiser compasses featured a sighting notch, a mechanically-damped or "dry" needle, adjustable declination and a large dial marked in individual degrees using counterclockwise calibration (reversed east and west positions). A screw base for a tripod or jacob staff (monopod) was often fitted as well.

By the late 1960s many foresters had begun using more modern liquid-damped compass designs, including mirror-sight protractor models such as the Silva Type 15 Ranger or the Suunto MC-1 (later, the MC-2). These compasses were fast to use, particularly along straight cruise lines and were sufficiently accurate for most forestry applications. On the other hand, geologists, speleologists, archaeologists, ornithologists, and foresters engaged in precision survey work often used direct-reading models such as the Suunto KB-14, prismatic compasses such as Suunto KB-77 or the traditional Brunton Pocket Transit. Many models featured an optional quadrant (0-90-0 degree) scale instead of an azimuthal (0-360 degree) system.

By using a hand compass in combination with aerial photographs and maps a person can determine his/her location in the field, determine direction to landmarks or destinations, estimate distance, estimate area, and find points of interest (marked boundary lines, USGS marker, plot centers). For increased accuracy, many professional hand compasses continue to be fitted with tripod mounts. While the hand compass continues to be widely employed in such work, it has been increasingly supplanted in recent years by use of the GPS, or Global Positioning System receiver.

=== Marine hand bearing compass ===
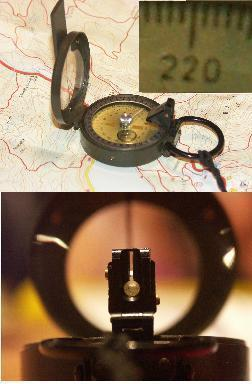
Floating-card compass with prismatic sight (bearing 220° through eyepiece)

The marine hand compass, or hand bearing compass, as it is termed in nautical use, has been used by small-boat or inshore sailors since at least the 1920s to keep a running course or to record precise bearings to landmarks on shore in order to determine position via the resection technique. Instead of a magnetized needle or disc, most hand bearing compasses feature liquid damping with a floating card design (a magnetized, degreed float or dial atop a jeweled pivot bearing). Equipped with a viewing prism, the hand bearing compass allows instant reading of forward bearings from the user to an object or vessel, and some provide the reciprocal bearing as well. Modern examples of marine hand bearing compasses include the Suunto KB-14 and KB-77, and the Plastimo Iris 50. These compasses frequently have battery-illuminated or photoluminescent degree dials for use in low light or darkness.
