= Equatorial sextant =

Navigational instrument

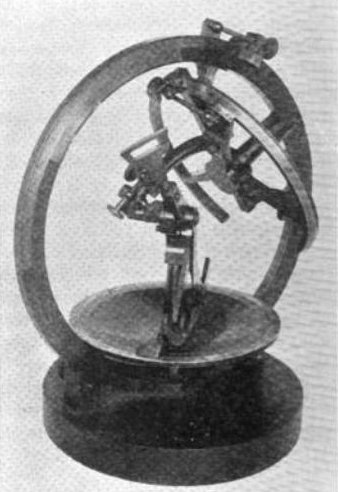
Burt's equatorial sextant

An equatorial sextant is a modified version of a sextant. One historically significant instrument called by that name was John Flamsteed's equatorial sextant, installed in the Greenwich Observatory in 1676. Seven feet across and possessing an iron frame, it was mounted at an angle that aligned with the celestial equator, so that as it rotated, it tracked the motion of objects across the night sky. Flamsteed used this instrument to measure angles of right ascension from 1676 through 1689 or 1690.

Another device known by that name was patented by the American inventor William Austin Burt in 1856. Burt's equatorial sextant included several elaborations on the basic sextant design, which enabled its user to determine navigational information without a supplemental chart or the need for calculation.
