= Marine sandglass =

Type of hourglass used at sea

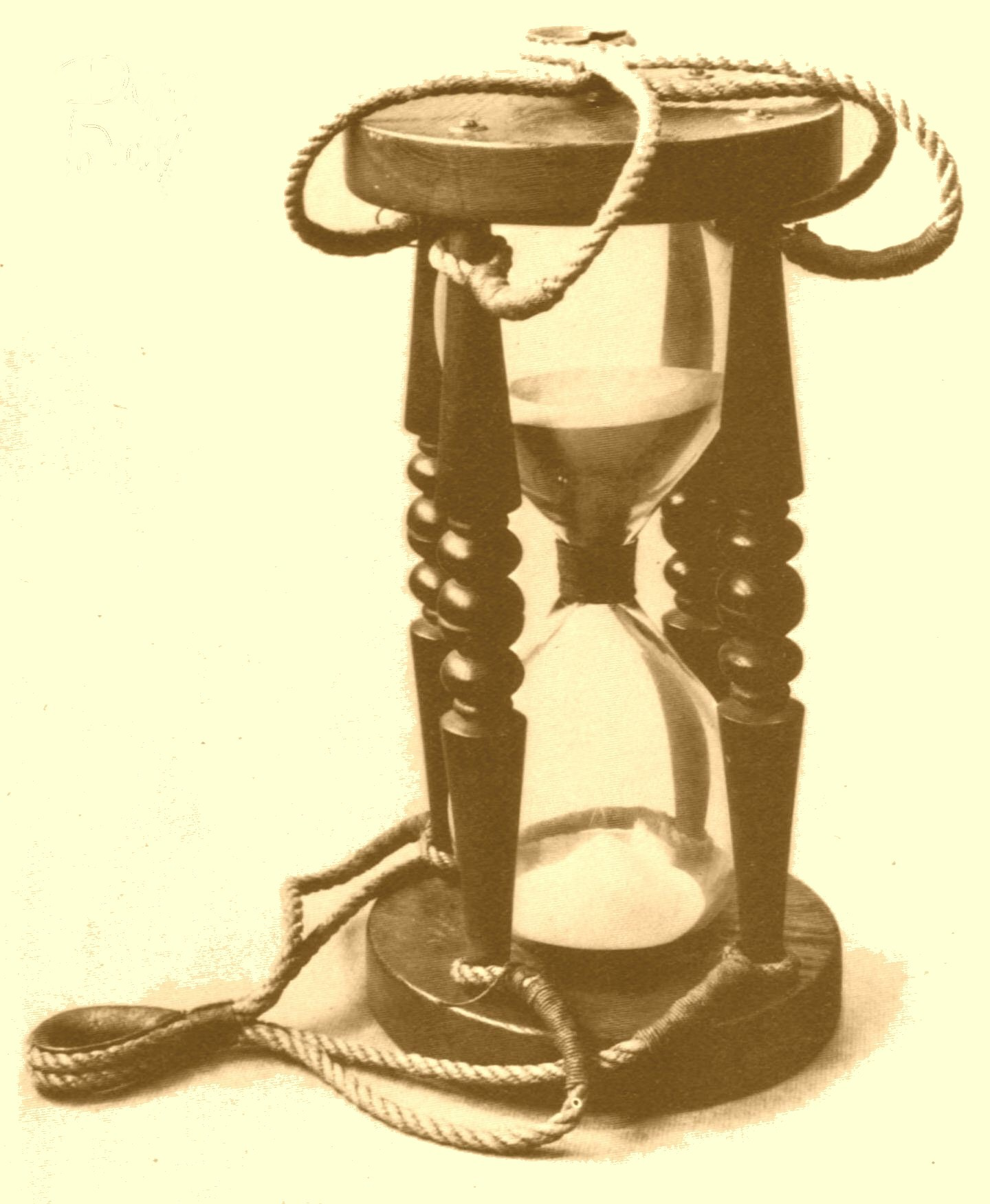
1859 Helmsman's marine sandglass, in a four-column wood stand

A marine sandglass is a timepiece of simple design that is a relative of the common hourglass, a marine (nautical) instrument known since the 14th century (although reasonably presumed to be of very ancient use and origin). Sandglasses were used to measure the time at sea or on a given navigational course, in repeated measures of small time increments (e.g., 30 minutes). Used together with the chip log, smaller marine sandglasses were also used to measure the boat speed through the water in knots.

Although vital to maritime navigation, marine sandglasses were not accurate measuring instruments for the passage of time; many design and environmental factors could affect the duration of sand's flow, and therefore its reported time. Their use continued through the early 19th century, when they were supplanted by reliable mechanical timepieces and by other advances in marine navigation.

Marine sandglasses were very popular on ships, as they were the most dependable measurement of time while at sea. Unlike the liquid-based clepsydra, the motion of the ship did not affect the hourglass. The fact that the hourglass also used granular materials instead of liquids gave it more accurate measurements, as the clepsydra was prone to get condensation inside it during temperature changes. In conjunction with a record of a ship's speed and direction, seamen used the hourglass to determine their position with reasonable accuracy.

== Design and use ==
Marine sandglasses originally consisted of two glass bottles, one inverted above the other, connected by a small tube, with the ends wrapped and so joined together. Over time, the later progress in the art of glassblowing allowed them to be made in a single piece. The marine glass was filled with sand or a suitable material such as finely ground eggshell, lead or tin chips (used to avoid humidity). This flowing material was chosen with two main objectives–to avoid the humidity, and to absorb motion– which are both required for shipboard use.

Placed in the upper half, the sand would flow slowly and steadily towards the lower half by the action of gravity, taking a certain time to empty (that was calibrated during their design and manufacture). Once the upper portion of the glass was empty, the glass could be turned to measure another time period.

== History ==
=== Antiquity ===
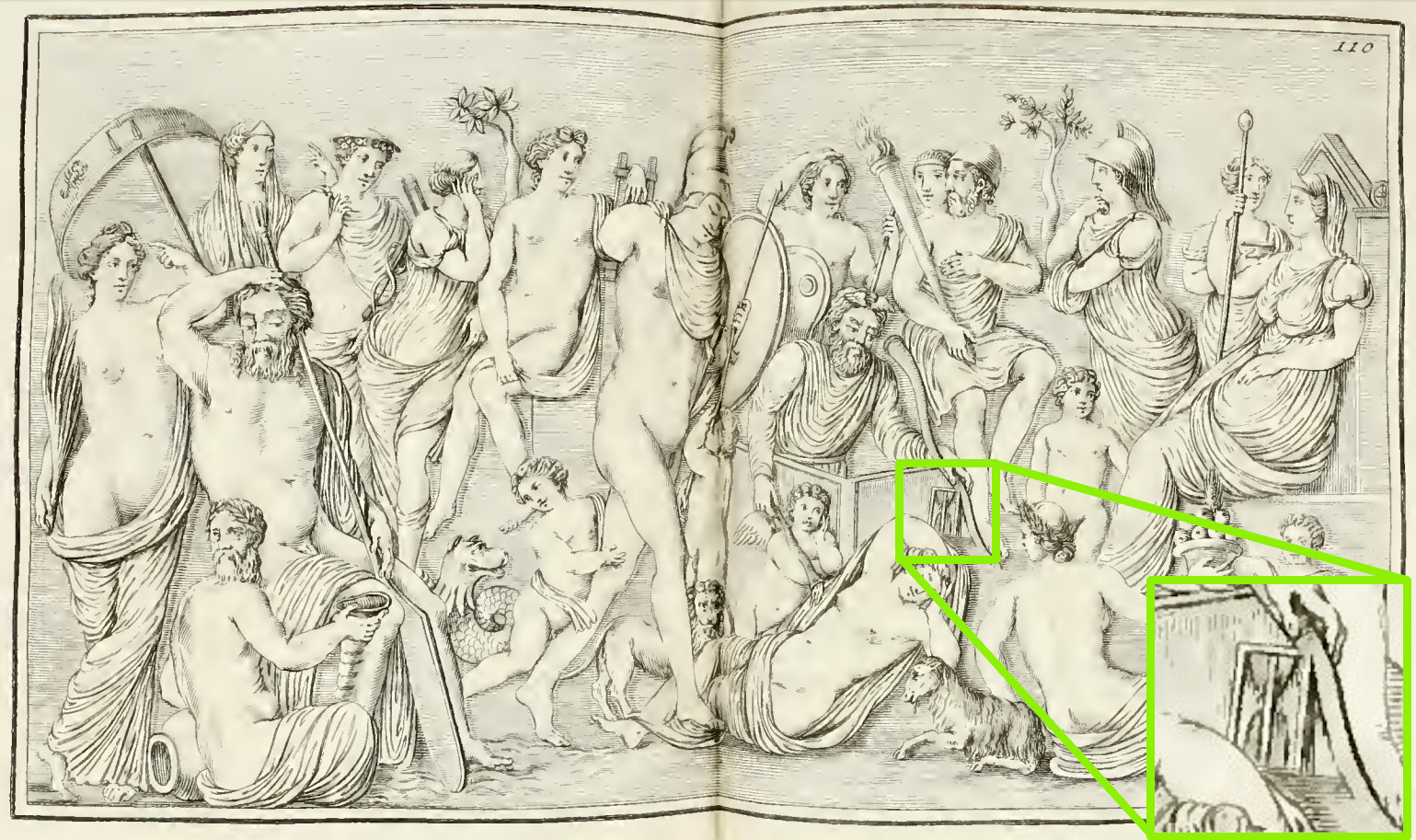
Sarcophagus dated ca 350 AD, representing the wedding of Peleus and Thetis (Wincklemann: observe the magnification with the hourglass held by Morpheus in his hands)

The origin of the hourglass is unclear, although unlike its predecessor the clepsydra, or water clock, which may have been invented in ancient Egypt, the first referenced use:

- According to The American Institute of New York: The clepsammia or sand-glass was invented at Alexandria about 150 B. C.
- According to the Journal of the British Archaeological Association: the so-called clepsammia were in use before the time of St Jerome (335 AD)
- M.Llauradó, found during an investigation, the first representation of an hourglass in a sarcophagus dated c. 350 AD, representing the wedding of Peleus and Thetis, discovered in Rome in the 18th century, and studied by Wincklemann in the 19th century, who remarked the hourglass held by Morpheus in his hands.

=== Middle Ages ===
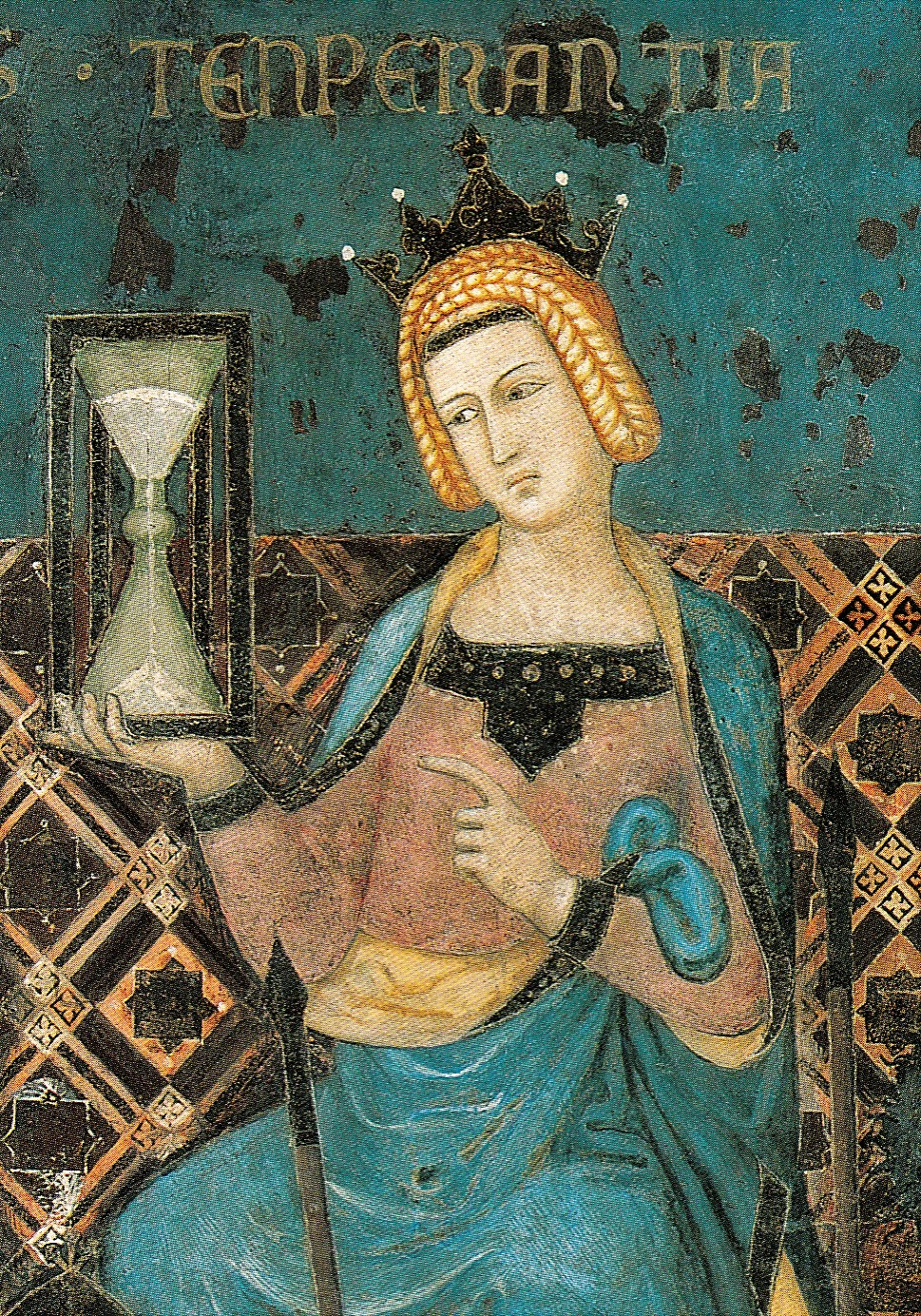
Temperance bearing an hourglass; detail Lorenzetti's Allegory of Good Government, 1338

From Roman times it disappears completely from historical records until it is re-introduced in medieval Europe. By the 8th century it is mentioned by a monk named Luitprand, who served at the cathedral of Chartres, France. But it was not until the 14th century that the marine sandglass was seen commonly, the earliest firm evidence being a depiction in the 1338 fresco Allegory of Good Government by Ambrogio Lorenzetti.

For more than 500 years (from 1300 to 1800) the instrument for measuring time at sea was "the Ampoule of hours". In Catalonia there are references of its manufacture since the middle of the 14th century made of Catalan transparent glass according to the formulas of the alchemist Guillem Sedacer, using as a fundent the soda ash obtained by burning barilla (a plant whose ashes dissolved in water and cast with a sieve have been the basis from the "laundry" to wash clothes from the Neolithic). Barilla grows on the Catalan coast from Orihuela to Montpellier and the Italian manuals for making Italian glass (La Sedacina and Arte Vetraria) say very strictly: "bisogna comprare la soda di Spagna" ("you must buy soda from Spain").

The use of the marine sandglass has been recorded since the 14th century; The written records about it were mostly from logbooks of European ships. In the same period it appears in other records and lists of ships stores. The earliest recorded reference that can be said with certainty to refer to a marine sandglass dates from c. 1345, in a receipt of Thomas de Stetesham, clerk of the King's ship La George, in the reign of Edward III of England; translated from the Latin, the receipt says: in 1345:

The same Thomas accounts to have paid at Lescluse, in Flanders, for twelve glass horologes (" pro xii. orlogiis vitreis "), price of each 4½ gross', in sterling 9s. Item, For four horologes of the same sort (" de eadem secta "), bought there, price of each five gross', making in sterling 3s. 4d.

Another reference is found in an extensive inventory of the property of Charles V of France in his possession at the time of his death on September 16, 1380. One item is an hourglass from the king's study at his castle of St. Germain en Laye, described as follows:

Item ung grant orloge de mer, de deux grans fiolles plains de sablon, en ung grant estuy de boys garny d'archal.

[Item a large sea clock, with two large phials filled with sand, in a large wooden brass-bound case.]

Although John the Hunter sent him the Catalan Atlas, as a present in 1375, this "orloge de mer" or "heures de naviguer", was sent to him, as a gift, when he was still just a prince (being, therefore, before 1356 when he took the place of his father in prison), by John the hunter, through his daughter Yolande of Aragon. In the shipment, John asks his daughter to send him the manuscript by Jean de Mandeville, "to translate it into the Aragonese language". This point is essential to know the language of the original book requested, since it does not say "to translate it into the Catalan language", which would have been the most important action, because Catalan was their language - this fact therefore implied, that there was no need for a translation into Catalan - on the other hand, if there would have existed in Catalonia, a copy of the ms. in Catalan language, John wouldn't have asked his daughter for an original, this fact proves that the manuscript in the hands of Yolande of Aragon was written in the vehicular language between John the Hunter and his daughter, in Catalan.

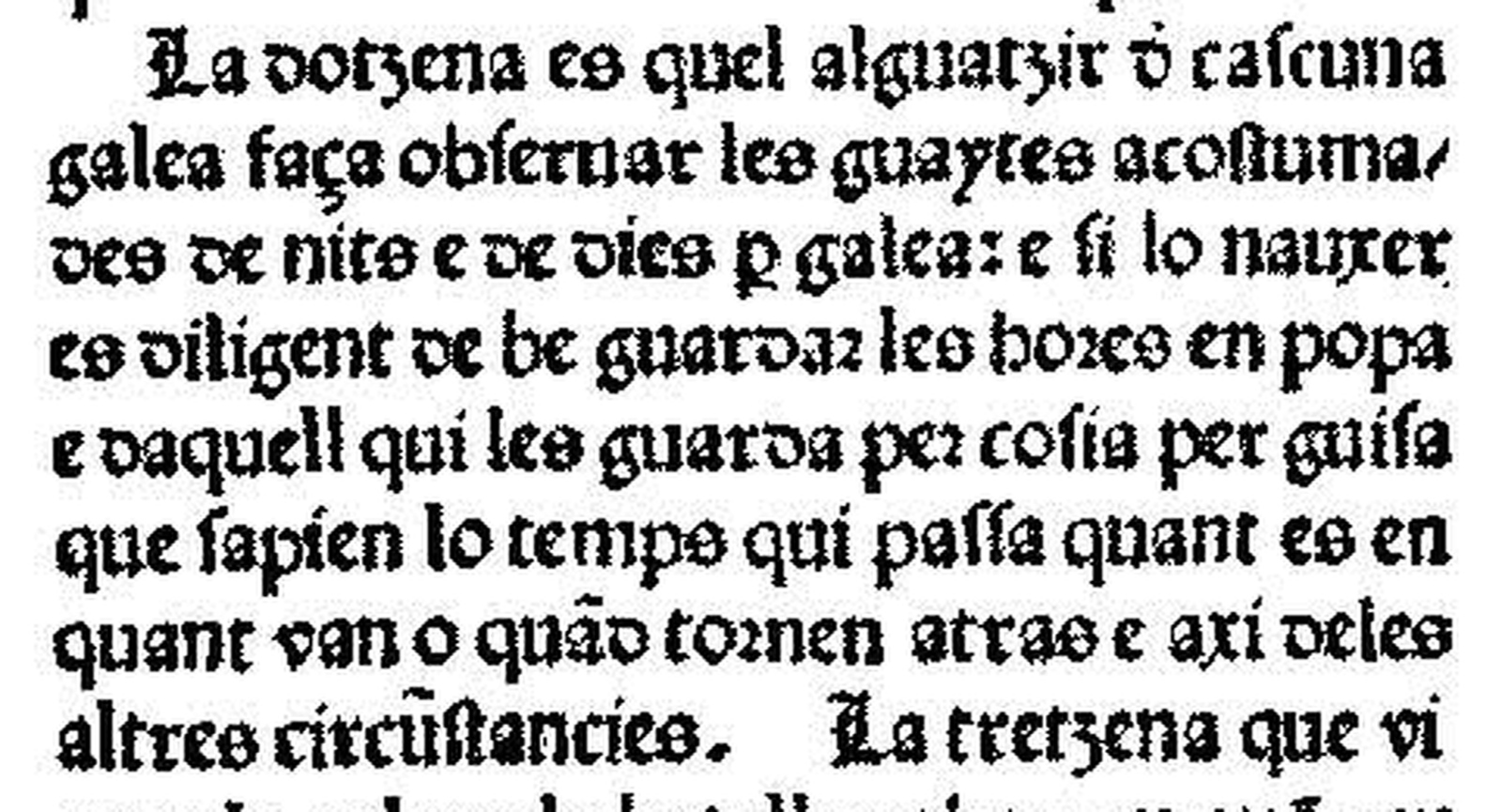
Dotzè del Crestià (Valencia – 1484)

The most interesting thing about the second reference, the one from King Charles, is that a common sand-glass is defined as "ung grant orloge de mer" or "a large sea clock", this together with the fact that the first explanation of its use at sea (found by M.Llauradó) appears in the Francesc Eiximenis work "lo dotzé del crestià" and that was given to him as a present from Joan I of Aragon, suggests that, at this period, the importance of a sand-glass was more commonly related to its use at sea and its fabrication demand may have been originated from the navigational needs from the Catalan navy, a maritime power of the moment in the Mediterranean.

- Francesc Eiximenis in the Dotzé del Crestià spoke of naval warfare and of the discipline and order to be observed on ships. Regarding the measurement of time, he wrote what appears in the picture:
- In French galleys no reference could be found until the French manuscript Stolonomie from the years 1547–1550, where it says that each galley must carry: "... Quatres ampoulletes à sablon pour mestré les gardes à heures...". A phrase very similar to the Catalan Eiximenis.

== Importance in navigation ==
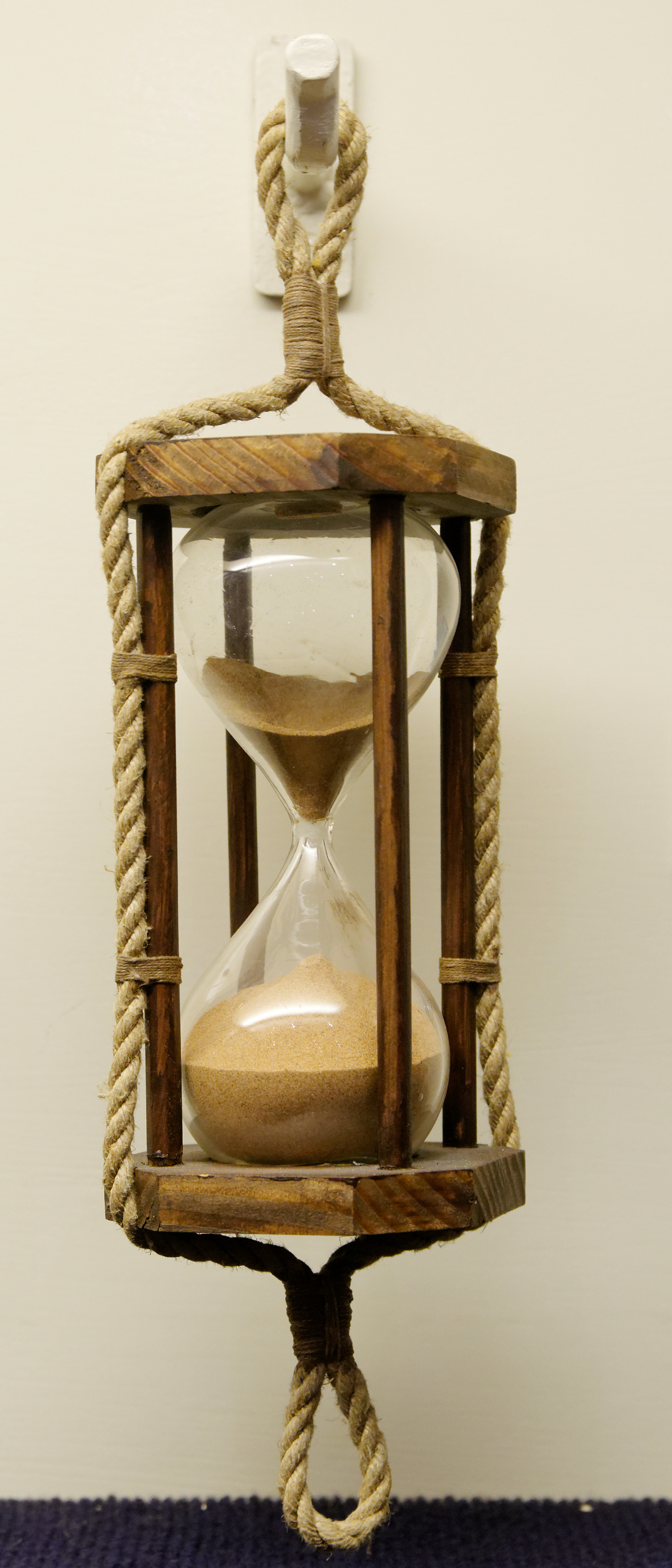
Copy of a four-column marine sandglass

In long-distance navigation through the open ocean, the sandglass or "glass" used to measure the time was a tool as important as the compass (which indicated sailing direction, and so ship's course). Filled with the amount of sand suitable for measuring a lapse of half an hour, each time the sand emptied was also called a "glass"; eight glasses (four hours) defined a "watch". The times determined by the sandglass, along with the record in the logbook of the speed measured with the "chip log", permitted the ship's navigator to plot his map position. Multiplying the ship's speed by the time the course had been kept (measured with the glass), gave traveled distance, a simple, overall method termed dead reckoning.

The marine sandglass was critical for maritime navigation before the 19th century. At the beginning of that century it became possible to navigate by the lunar distances, thanks to the tables of haversines of Joseph de Mendoza y Ríos. Prior to this, dead reckoning navigation based on sandglass-determined times was used, alongside determination of latitude using the quadrant (see also backstaff, astrolabe, and octant); this was the only system available to mariners to navigate the globe. The parallel use of relative time measurements at sea, and time measurement by mechanical clocks on land continued from at least 1350 to 1805, i.e., for more than 450 years.

Although vital to navigation, the marine glass was not an accurate instrument to measure the passage of time. The design of the glass affected its accuracy in time measurement; the uniformity in fineness of the sand, the inner diameter of the connecting tube, and design aspects allowing wear that would effect the flow of sand all could contribute. In addition, many shipboard factors could affect the duration of sand's flow and therefore influence the time measured, including the humidity inside the glass, the ability for it to be positioned in a perfectly vertical position, and the acceleration or deceleration of the ship's movements. Finally, the use of short duration glasses to measure long periods of time introduced further error. Marine glass use was supplanted by reliable mechanical timepieces, and by other advances in marine navigation.

== Watch sandglasses ==
Watch sandglasses were used on ships to measure watch times, typically in half-hour periods. The helmsman or ship's page were the crewmen responsible for turning the watch sandglass, thus supplying the time to be registered on the ship's log; watch measurement began with the sun reaching its highest point—its zenith—at midday, which was likewise the essential time reference point for navigation. At that point in time, the ship's bell was struck eight times; after the first glass had emptied (half an hour), the ship's bell was struck once, after another glass, twice, and so on until four hours after midday, when it was again struck eight times. At that point, a new watch began, and the sequence was repeated.

Hence, in the voyages of Columbus, there are records that his crew logged the passage of time using a half-hour "ampolleta" (glass) that was turned every time it emptied to keep track of the "canonical" hours. Likewise, during the voyage of Ferdinand Magellan to circumnavigate the globe, 18 hourglasses from Barcelona were in the ship's inventory, after the trip being authorized by emperor Charles V.

== Chip-log sandglass ==
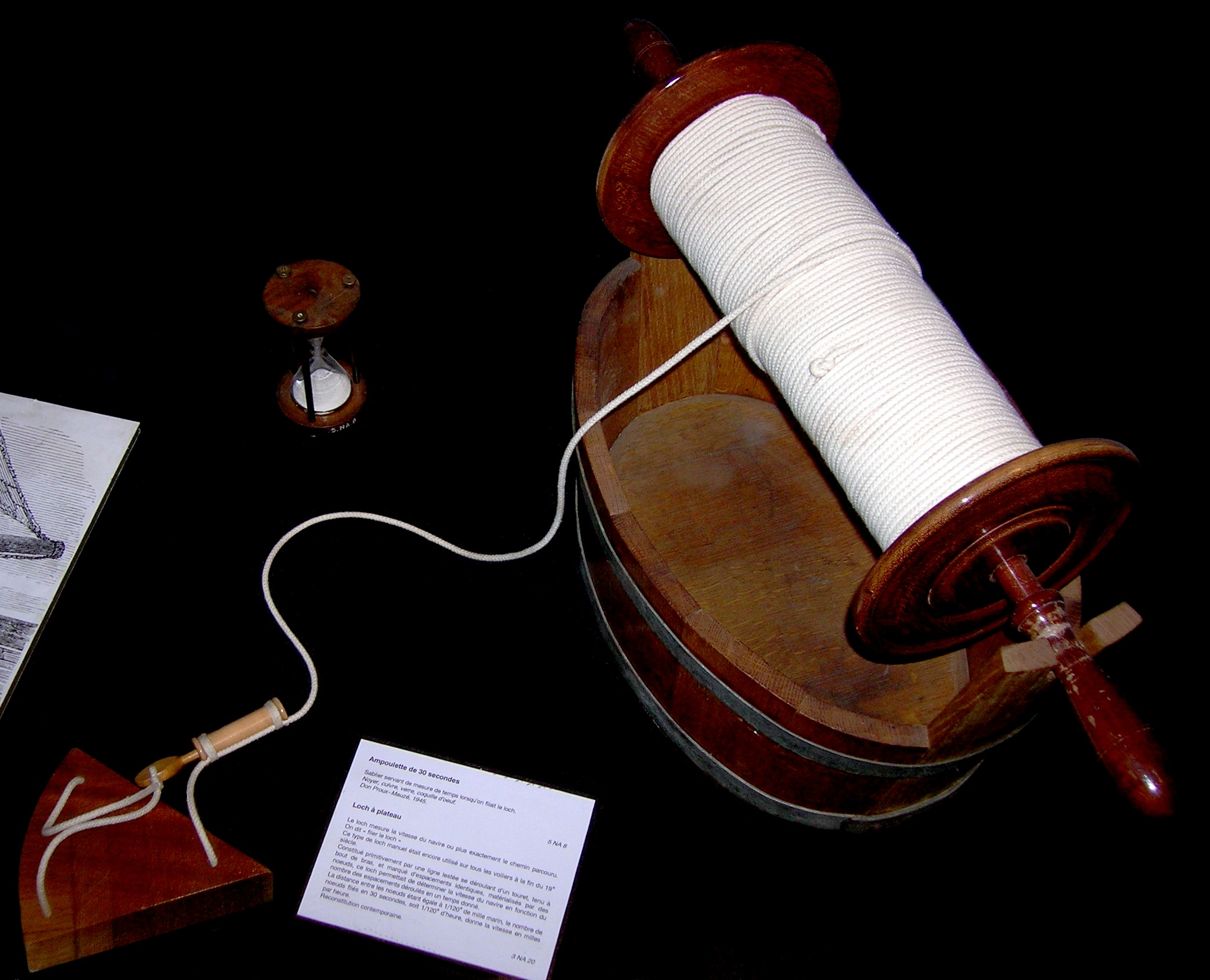
Ship log sandglass in the left of the chip log

From the 16th century a much smaller 30-second "glass" was used along with the chip log, to measure the speed (in knots) of the vessel over the water. The procedure was as follows:

A sailor ran the chip log and another sailor the sandglass. The slide of the chip log was pulled over the stern and let run the first length of line till the quadrant was stabilized in the water. The sailor was leaving to run the line to pass freely leaving the slide by hand and touching the first knot sang "mark!" At the moment of the inverted glass and time began to run while the line was counting the knots as they passed until the sandglass sang "mark!" a second blow when they had dropped all the sand, then he caught the firmly the line, measuring the fraction of knot elapsed to the last mark! and cried P.E.: "Five knots and four fathoms!..

== See also ==
- Water clock
- Hourglass
- Grid compass
- Rhumbline network
- Catalan navy
