= Negus (disambiguation) =

Negus is a title in the Eritrean and Northern Ethiopian Semitic languages.

Negus may also refer to:

- Negus (surname), a surname
- Negus (drink), a hot mixed drink of wine
- Negus Mine, a Canadian gold producer 1939–1952
- Negus (album), by Mos Def, 2019
- Negus Nurse, Guyanese singer
