= Reggae Embassy =

- Founded: 2006
- Founder: The Worldwide Elite Embassy
- Origins: Kingston, Jamaica
- Region served: Worldwide
- Key people: Christina Grand (COO)
- Website: reggaeembassy.org

The Worldwide Reggae Music and Entertainment Embassy Limited, also known as the Reggae Embassy, is a career and business development, support and advancement organization, with headquarters in Kingston, Jamaica. The Reggae Embassy is the official embassy for the reggae industry, and was announced to the world in 2012 during Jamaica's 50th anniversary of independence.

== History ==
On March 28, 2012, the Reggae Embassy made history when their advocacy division's year long lobbying efforts were successful when they requested BMI also known as BMI to recognize reggae, dancehall and soca as music genres when songwriters and publisher register their music. This affected the Reggae Industry in a positive way on a global level.

The advocacy efforts were led by Reggae Embassy COO Christina Grand, and with the assistance of BMI Executive Director of its London office, Brandon Bakshi, history was made.

The Reggae Embassy website was launched in 2012.

=== Clients ===
- Christina Grand
- Eldie Anthony
- Ma'Niche
- Bena
