= Thomas S. Negus =

Thomas S. Negus may refer to:

- Thomas S. Negus (manufacturer) (1828–1894)
- Thomas S. Negus (pilot boat)
