= Isopar =

Isopar may refer to:

- Isopar, a formulation of the anti-tuberculosis drugs isoniazid & para-amino salicylic acid
- Isopar, short for isoparaffin, a liquid fuel used in pyrotechnics, similar to kerosene, see also alkane or Isopar M
