= Lubber =

Lubber may refer to:

- Lubber line, a reference marker on a craft's compass or radar display
- Lubber grasshoppers
