= Negus (surname) =

Negus is a surname. Notable people with the surname include:

- Abram J. Negus, American prohibitionist who ran in the 1912 United States House of Representatives elections
- Anthony Negus, British conductor
- Arthur Negus (1903—1985), British broadcaster and antiques expert
- Domonic Negus, English boxer who fought Danny Williams
- Francis Negus (died 1732), English military officer, courtier, and politician
- Fred Negus (1923—2005), American football player
- George Negus (1942–2024), Australian author, journalist, and television presenter
- James Negus (1927—2008), British philatelist and book editor
- Joel Negus, American guitarist who played for Born of Osiris
- Simon Negus, English drummer for Sabbat (English band)
- Steve Negus (born 1952), Canadian drummer and songwriter
- Syd Negus (1912—1986), Australian politician
- Thomas S. Negus (manufacturer) (1828–1894), American businessman, namesake for Thomas S. Negus (pilot boat)
- Tony Negus, Commissioner of the Australian Federal Police since 2009
- Victor Negus (1887—1974), British laryngologist, surgeon and comparative anatomist
