= Break Free =

Break Free may refer to:

== Film and television ==
- Break Free (TV series), a 2013 Malaysian television series
- Break Free (film), a 2003 Italian romance-comedy drama film
- Break Free, a short film by Ruby Rose

== Music ==
=== Albums ===
- Break Free - Treasure Isle Classics, 2006 reggae album by Mike Brooks
- Break Free, 2015 debut double album by Eldie Anthony

=== Songs ===
- "Break Free" (song), 2014 song by Ariana Grande
- "Break Free", 1994 song by The Kelly Family
- "Break Free", 1992 song by the band Europe, the B-side of "I'll Cry for You"
- "Break Free (Lead the Way)", the ending theme song for the video game Super Mario Odyssey

== See also ==
- Breaking Free (disambiguation)
- "I Want to Break Free", 1984 song by Queen
