= Cammenga =

U.S. outdoors products company

- Type: Private
- Industry: Tritium navigation; tactical weaponry
- Founded: 1992, Holland, Michigan, U.S.
- Headquarters: Dearborn, Michigan, U.S.
- Area served: Worldwide
- Products: Lensatic Compass; EasyLoader; EasyMag; Beta Blades
- Number of employees: 40 — July 2009
- Website: http://www.cammenga.com/

Cammenga, based in Dearborn, Michigan, is an outdoor products company known for producing navigation equipment under contract for the United States Armed Forces. They are the official supplier of the M-1950 lensatic field compass issued to the U.S. Army and Marine Corps infantry and artillery units.

IET International acquired 100% of the company’s stock in April 2020.

== Profile ==
Cammenga was founded in 1992 by John Cammenga, a US Army veteran, to produce the M-1950 3H lensatic compass for the U.S. Armed Forces. Since 1992, Cammenga has held the U.S. military contract for the M-1950. The firm develops, manufactures, and distributes a wide variety of products to military, law enforcement, and commercial markets around the world, including land navigation instruments, firearm sighting and loading systems, firearm magazines, tritium knives, and other tritium light source integration services. The company provides development assistance in tritium (self-luminous) lighting products, NRC approval processing, tritium capsule assembly and installation procedures, and product testing. The company is ISO 9001:2000 certified.[]

== U.S. M-1950 3H Lensatic Compass ==
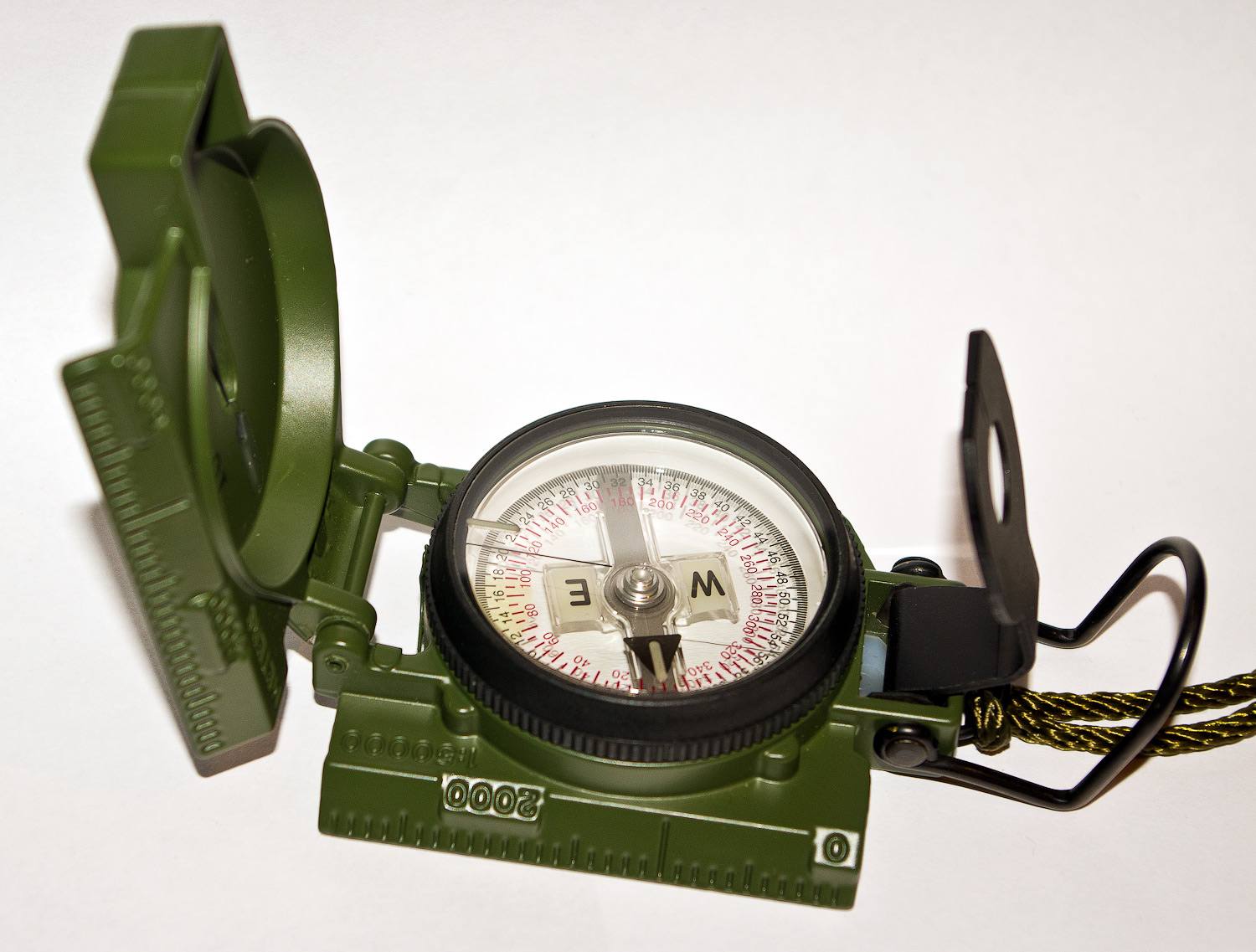
Cammenga lensatic compass

The M-1950 U.S. military lensatic field compass with self-luminous lighting (designated the Model 3H by Cammenga) is fitted with self-luminous tritium vial lighting. Under U.S. military specification (MIL-SPEC) performance criteria, ten pre-production samples of the M-1950 are required to meet a battery of performance, durability, and accuracy standards. This includes an overall inherent accuracy standard of ±40 mils (2.25 degrees) from actual magnetic azimuth; a tritium illumination test; and a shock or impact test, in which samples of the M-1950 are tested by dropping the compass from a height of 90 cm (35 in.) on a solid surface covered with 10 cm (4 in.) of plastic-covered sand, followed by testing to ensure performance within specified accuracy standards. A water leakage test is also performed.

== See also ==
- Compass
- Navigation
- Orienteering
