= Negus Nurse =

Guyanese singer

NEGUS
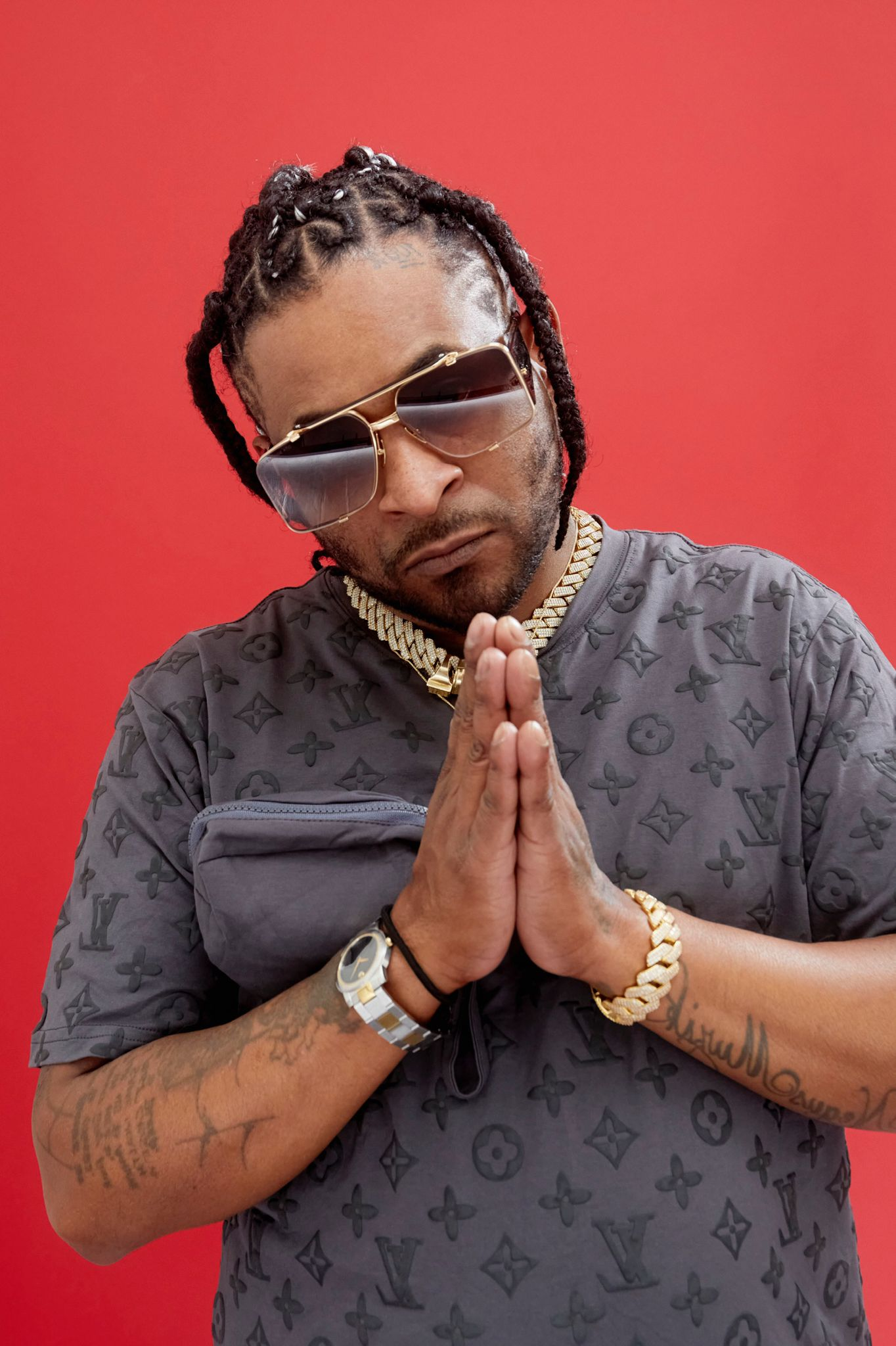

Background information
- Born: Alwin Oswald Nurse; Georgetown, Guyana
- Genres: Dancehall; Reggae
- Occupations: Singer; Entrepreneur; Songwriter; Tattoo Artist; Producer; Graphic Designer; Video Editor
- Years active: 2012–present

Alwin Oswald Nurse, known professionally as NEGUS, is a Guyanese reggae dancehall recording artist, composer, singer-songwriter, record producer, and tattoo artist. Nurse owns the Madd Art Tattoo shop in Toronto. He is a father of two boys and has eight siblings.

== Background ==
Born in Georgetown, Guyana, Nurse's early exposure to music came from his father Kenneth Nurse, known as "Small Man", who was in the Guyanese band Mingles Sound Machine in the late 1990s.

In 1990, Nurse moved to Trinidad and Tobago with his mother Sabrina Waddle, a songwriter from Port of Spain. He spent time in both Guyana and Trinidad and Tobago during his school years.

== Career ==
Before focusing on music, Nurse worked at Signature Selection in Macoya, Trinidad, where he encountered artists such as Oscar B, Leon Coldero, Iwer George, and Bunji Garlin. In 2003, Nurse relocated to Canada to concentrate on his music career.

Nurse has performed with artists like Beenie Man, Buju Banton, Mr. Vegas, and Red Rat. In 2012, he collaborated with Konshens on the song “Dah Wine Deh”. He founded Street Platinum Records, producing music for artists including Tommy Lee Sparta, Sikka Rymes, Jahvillani, Kalado, and Navino.
