= Ecompass =

An eCompass or e-Compass is a tilt compensated electronic compass utilizing an accelerometer and a magnetometer. A number of manufacturers, including Motorola, AKM Semiconductor, NXP, Bosch Sensortec, and ST micro make eCompasses. eCompasses are also found in some laptops such as the HP Spectre. Today's smartphones often include an eCompass sensor which acts as a real compass and helpful in some games also.

== See also ==
- Magnetometer
- Compass
- Accelerometer
