= Thomas S. Negus (manufacturer) =

American businessman, manufacturer

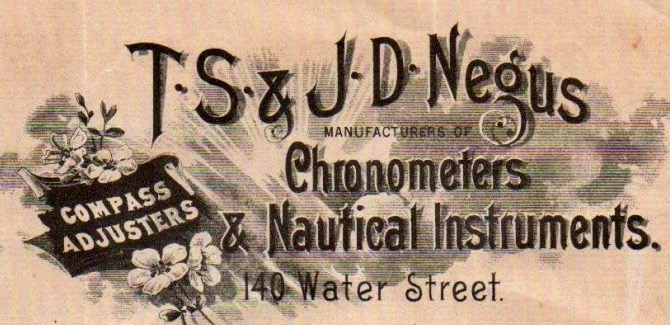
- T.S. & J.D. Negus Company
- Born: May 1, 1828; New York City
- Died: March 17, 1894 (aged 65); Jersey City, New Jersey, US
- Occupation: manufacturer
- Known for: Marine chronometer

Thomas S. Negus (May 1, 1828 – March 17, 1894) was a 19th-century American businessman. He was well known for the manufacture and sale of maritime chronometers and nautical instruments in New York City under the name T.S. & J.D. Negus Company. He served on the Board of Pilot Commissioners for New Jersey. He died on March 17, 1894, in Jersey City, New Jersey. The firm continued in New York under the trade name "Negus" as a nautical instrument manufacturer and retailer into the 20th century.

== Early life ==
His brother, John Davidson Negus (1832–1890) was a partner in the T.S. & J.D. Negus Company.

== Career ==
=== T.S. and J.D. Negus ===
In 1848, Negus and his brother John D. Negus founded the firm of T.S. & J.D. Negus, which manufactured and sold maritime chronometers and nautical instruments at 140 Water Street, New York City near the East River. The firm made chronometers for the United States Navy as well as shipmasters and yachtsmen. Their instruments were among the best manufactured in the country. The firm traded as T. S. Negus & Co. in 1864 and as T.S. & J.D. Negus in 1869. The firm was described as "probably the most prolific American Chronometer manufacturer" up through the first quarter of the 20th century. From 1886 to 1887, in competitive trials of chronometers at the United States Naval Observatory, located in Washington, D. C., their chronometers passed first place in a list of 45 chronometers submitted for testing. Sea captains came to the shop to purchase and have their chronometers tested, rated and certified.

Thomas's brother, John D. Negus, died on September 26, 1890. John's son, John S. Negus continued in the firm under the T.S. & J.D. Negus name until his death on July 14, 1944. His son, John C. Negus, from Brooklyn, continued with the firm as senior partner until his death on December 15, 1961. His son, John S. Negus II, ran the family business until his death in 1963. On March 8, 1964, the New York Daily News announced that John C. Negus II bequeathed to the Museum of the City of New York a 19th-century ship's binnacle that the Negus firm made.

On May 1, 1931, the firm moved to 69 Pearl Street, New York. They had a five-story building with the words "Negus" on the front window. On the office safe was the gold lettering that said: "T. S. & J. D. Negus, Est. 1848." A Negus chronometer went with Robert Peary to the North Pole. Another was with Richard E. Byrd at the south Pole. When John Mercer Brooke was on the North Pacific Exploring and Surveying Expedition in 1852, he said the best chronometer on the expedition proved to the one made by T. S. Negus and Company, which was purchased by the government for $325. The Negus chronometer was thought to be a district advantage compared to those made in Europe.

=== Instruments ===
Negus instruments for sale included: alidades, binnacles, barometers, binoculars, chronometers, clinometers, clocks, compasses, lamps, lanterns, megaphones, octants, peloruses, sextants, telescopes, and quadrants. Below are two examples.

Taffrail Logs, operating on principles in a manner similar to a car's odometer by towing a rotor from the stern (or taffrail) by a long line. Negus boasted that their improved Taffrail Log was "the best ever manufactured." It featured a swivel-bearing mount for the recording element that was designed by John S. Negus and intended to reduce the irregularities encountered in rough seas. It the time it cost $27. The U.S. Navy transferred this example to the Smithsonian in 1950.

Box Chronometer, a 56-hour marine chronometer with a spring detent escapement, and indications for hours, minutes, seconds, and up and down. Weston College donated it to the Smithsonian in 1967. It the 1930s it cost $450.

=== Publications ===
- T. S. & J. D. Negus, Illustrated Catalogue and Price List of Nautical & Optical Instruments (New York, 1899).
- T. S. & J. D. Negus, Illustrated Catalogue of Nautical Instruments (New York, ca. 1938).

=== Pilots Commissioner ===
Negus was named Pilots Commissioner of the New Jersey board by Governor Parker of New Jersey. He was president of the New Jersey board for 15 years. He was a member of Holland Lodge of Free Masons and belonged to the Seventh Regiment for 14 years.

== Death ==
Negus died on March 17, 1894, at age 66. His funeral was at his home in Jersey City, New Jersey on March 20. His was buried at the Green-Wood Cemetery in Brooklyn.

== Legacy ==
The pilot-boat Thomas S. Negus was named in honor of Negus in 1873. On October 9, 1873, the pilot boat Thomas S. Negus won a notable victory over her competitors in the Cape May Regatta, which was a race from Owl's Head Point around to Cape May Lighthouse in New Jersey, and back to the Sandy hook Lightship. Thomas S. Negus, of the N. J. Pilots' Commissioners, was one of the invited guests on board the Negus during the race. Negus later wrote: "Arrived at the Lightship off Sandy Hook at 8 h. 49 m. 30s. A. M. Hailed Judges on board, who informed us we were the second boat in, The Enchantress only being ahead of us."

== Gallery ==
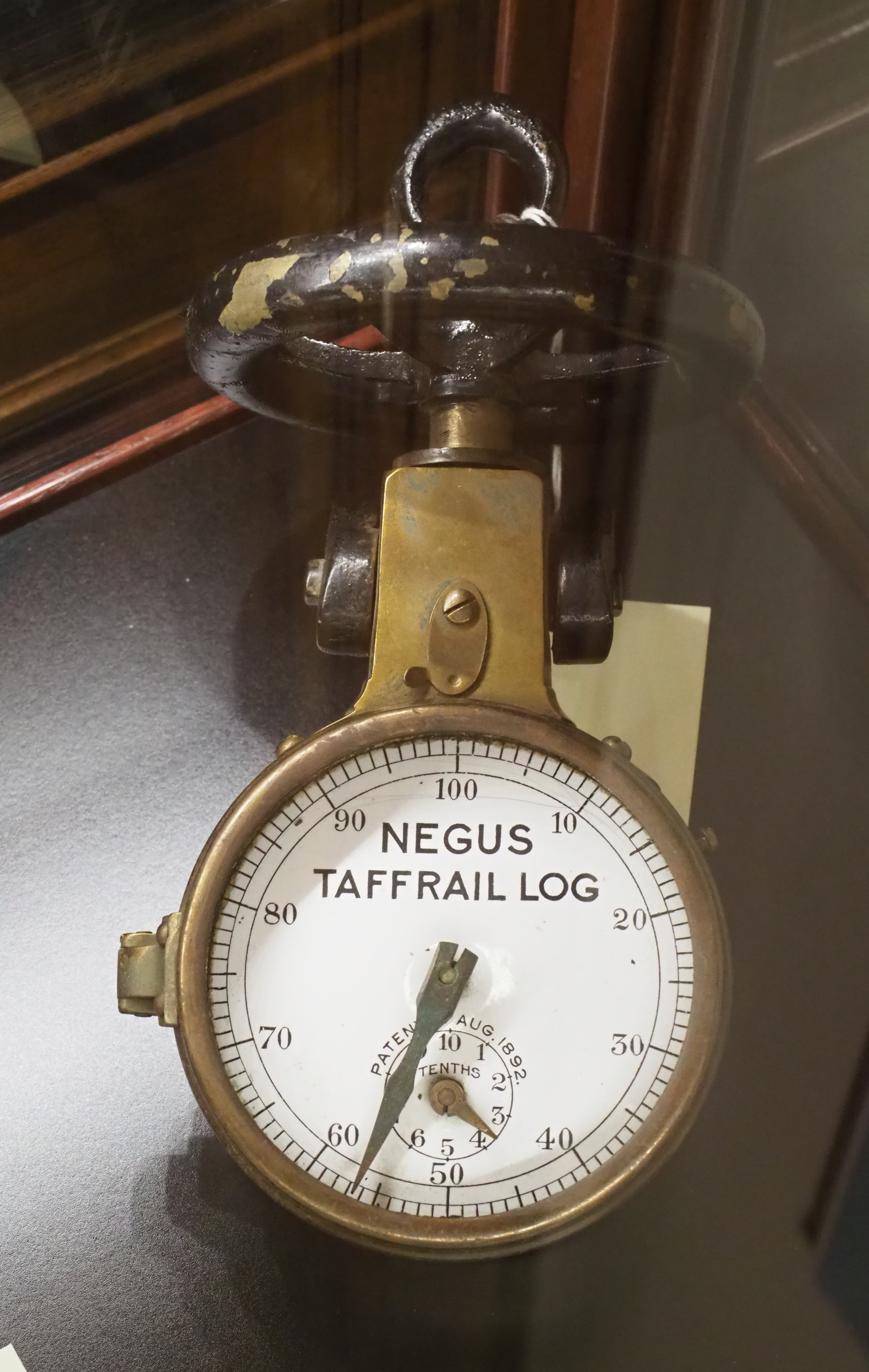
Negus Taffrail log

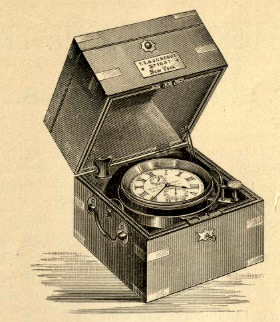
56-hour Marine chronometer

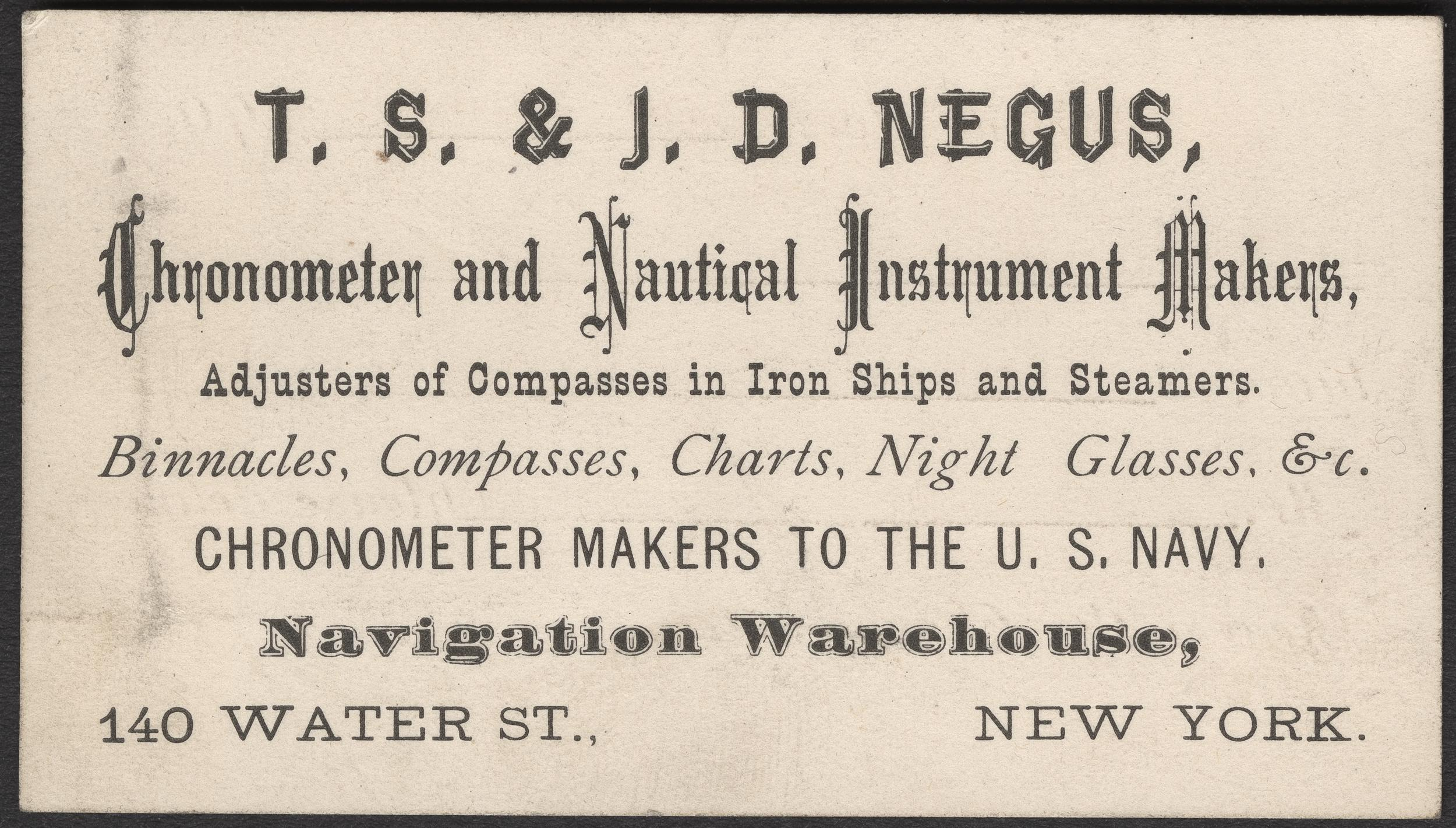
T.S. & J.D. Negus trade card

== See also ==
- Marine chronometer
- Navigational instrument
- List of Northeastern U. S. Pilot Boats
- T.S. & J.D. NEGUS (/) New York No.2245 as Smithsonian National Museum of American History: Catalogue number:ME*328483
