= Thumb compass =

Type of compass

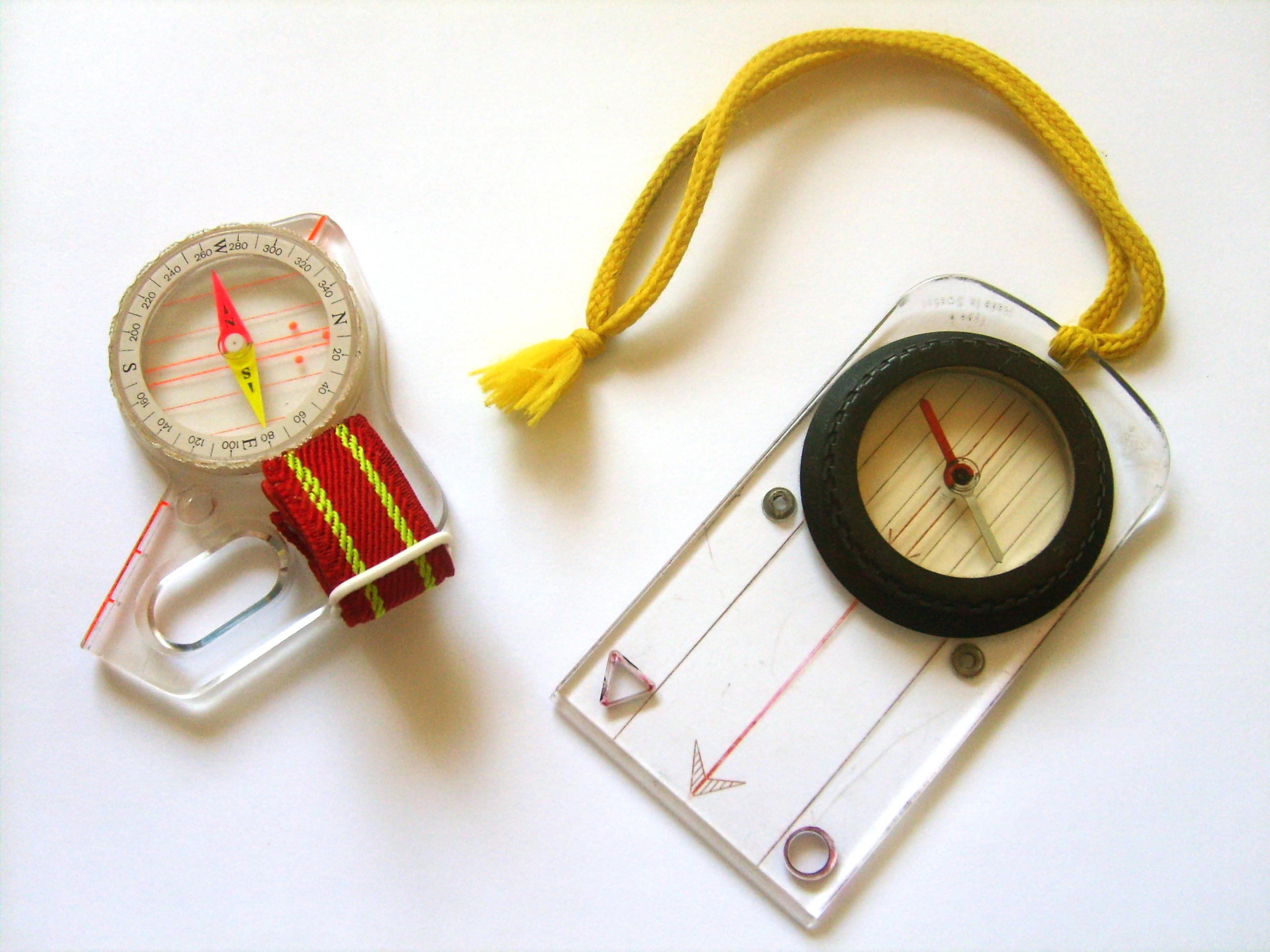
Thumb compass on left

A thumb compass is a type of compass commonly used in orienteering, a sport in which map reading and terrain association are paramount. In cases of homogeneous terrain with few distinct features, a bearing between two known points on the map may be used. Consequently, most thumb compasses have minimal or no degree markings at all, and are normally used only to take bearings directly from a map, and to orient a map to magnetic north. Thumb compasses are also often transparent so that an orienteer can hold a map in the hand with the compass and see the map through the compass.

== Overview ==
Thumb compasses attach to one's thumb using a small elastic band.

The first commercially successful orienteering thumb compass was the Norcompass, introduced by Suunto in 1983.

Placing an even greater emphasis on speed over accuracy, the wrist compass lacks even a baseplate, consisting solely of a needle capsule strapped to the carpometacarpal joint at the base of the thumb; the thumb serves the function of a baseplate when taking and sighting bearings. It is often used for city and park race orienteering.

== See also ==
- Protractor compass
- Hand compass
