= Eldie Anthony =

Jamaican musical artist (born 1984)

- Also known as: Eldie Anthony, LD Anthony
- Born: Elexcian Eldemire; 28 January 1984 (age 42)
- Origin: Kingston, Jamaica
- Genres: Reggae, Dancehall, Pop, R & B, Reggae Fusion, Hip Hop
- Occupations: Recording Artist, Singer, SongWriter, Producer
- Years active: 2005–present
- Label: Reggae Embassy
- Website: eldieanthony.com

Eldie Anthony (pronounced LD Anthony; born Elexcian Eldemire); is a recording artist, songwriter, and producer stemming from Kingston, Jamaica. Born 28 January 1984 in Kingston, Jamaica, he began singing at a young age, yet in 2004 he decided to dedicate his life to a career in music. He began working with various composers and producers.

== Career ==
In 2007, he then found his way to Harmony House where he started to master his sound. The great reggae icon Beres Hammond took him under his wing where he spent the next four years being mentored by the Reggae powerhouse himself.

In 2011, at a session in Anchor Recording Studios, he was introduced to Music Industry Executive, Christina Grand of the Music Embassies, who was also in charge of the official embassy for the reggae industry; Reggae Embassy. He later contacted the organization to learn more. In May of that year, he began to fully utilize the organization for his career development, advancement, bookings and publishing through Elite Embassy Publishing. The Reggae Embassy launched the official website for the Jamaican recording artist Eldie Anthony which consists of his music, photos, music videos, news and updates of the artist

In 2013, the Music Embassies featured many of Eldie Anthony's songs on their first compilation album; Music Embassies Spotlight Volume 1.

On 17 February 2015, Eldie Anthony released his debut double album entitled "Break Free" which was produced by the Reggae Embassy, Christina Grand and Eldie Anthony. It consists of two distinct sides entitled "Break Free – Reggae Vibration" and "Break Free – Yaadstream".

== Discography ==
- Jah Is by My Side (2013) – Composed By Asha D – Produced by Christina Grand, Eldie Anthony
- I Will Go On (2011) – Composed By DJ Rhome – Produced by DJ Rhome, Eldie Anthony, Christina Grand
- Singing in the Rain(2012) – Composed By El Toro – Produced by Christina Grand, Eldie Anthony
- Break Free (2013) – Composed By Mantis Tan Tan – Produced by Mantis Tan Tan, Christina Grand
- Want Mi Share (2013) – Composed By Bena Di Senior – Produced by Bena Di Senior
- Let Me Be Your Man (2012) – Composed By DJ Lanz 876 – Produced by Christina Grand
- Let Me Be Your Man Reggae Remix (2015) – Composed By Askell – Produced by Christina Grand, Askell – Vision House Records
- Living for Tomorrow (Featuring I-Noble) (2013) – Composed By DJ Lanz 876 – Produced by Christina Grand, Eldie Anthony
- Dance If You're Dancing (2011) – (Featuring Ma'Niche) (2013) – Composed By Roadz – Produced by Christina Grand, Roadz
