= Pelorus (instrument) =

Navigational reference instrument

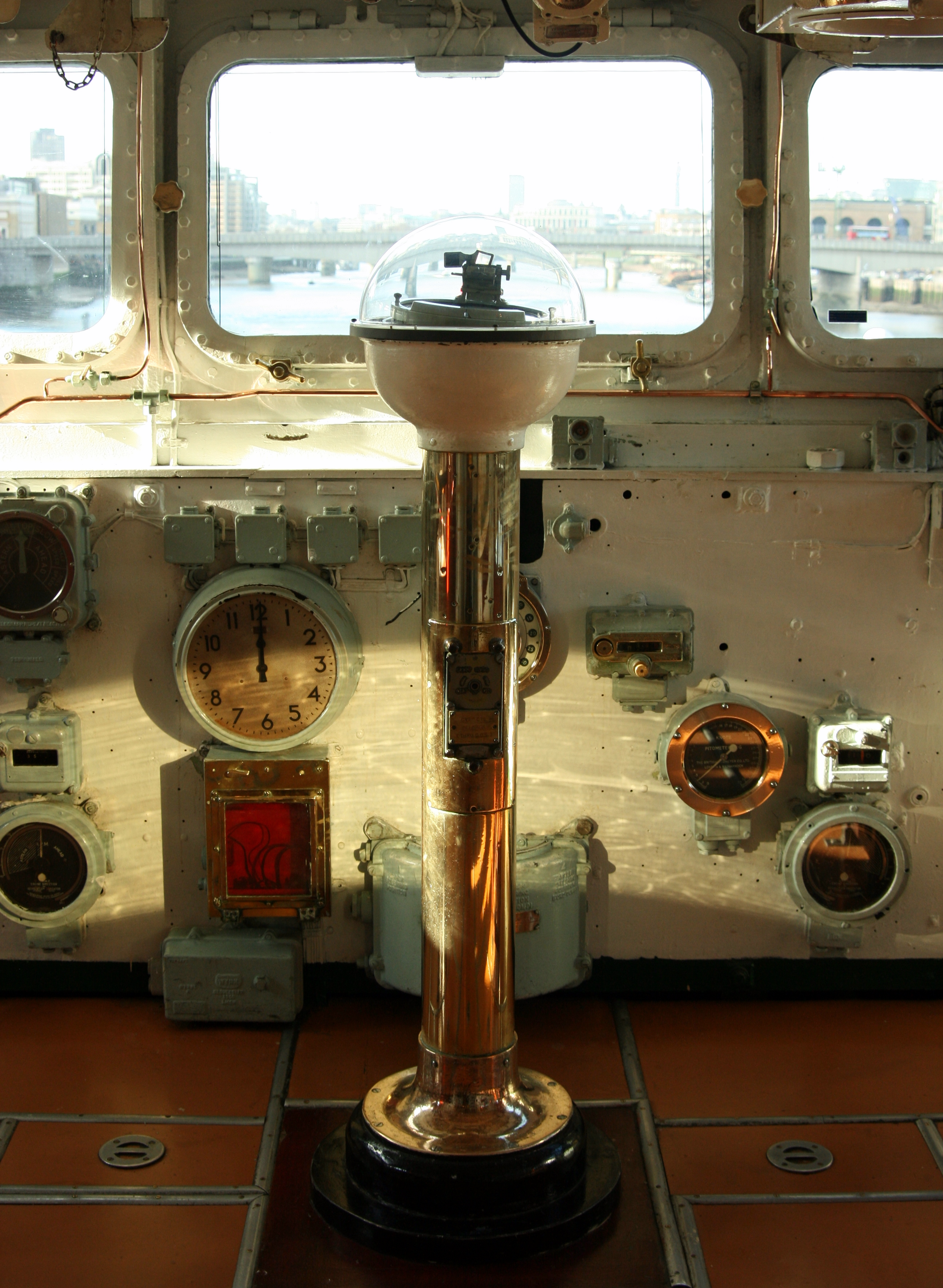
Pelorus aboard HMS Belfast

In marine navigation, a pelorus is a reference tool for maintaining bearing of a vessel at sea. It is a "simplified compass" without a directive element, suitably mounted and provided with vanes to permit observation of relative bearings.

The instrument was named for one Pelorus, said to have been the pilot for Hannibal, circa 203 BC.

== Ancient use ==
Harold Gatty described the use of a pelorus by Polynesians before their use of a compass. In equatorial waters the nightly course of stars overhead is nearly uniform during the year. This regularity simplified navigation for the Polynesians using a pelorus, or dummy compass:

[Arabs] divided the horizon into 32 points. These points were derived from fifteen stars which rose at approximately equally spaced points of the eastern horizon. The setting points of these stars on the western horizon gave them another fifteen points and north and south brought the total to thirty two.

These accomplished navigators [Polynesians] had names for one hundred and fifty stars. They knew the point on the horizon where each of these rose, and the time at which it did so. They knew the islands which each passed over.

Many of the peoples in the Pacific used the thirty two point dummy compass…I consider this…proof of the Indo-Malayan origin of the Polynesians.

— Harold Gatty, Nature Is Your Guide

Reading from North to South, in their rising and setting positions, these stars are:

Stars
Point	Star
N	Polaris
NbE	"the Guards" (Ursa Minor)
NNE	Alpha Ursa Major
NEbN	Alpha Cassiopeiae
NE	Capella
NEbE	Vega
ENE	Arcturus
EbN	the Pleiades
E	Altair
EbS	Orion's belt
ESE	Sirius
SEbE	Beta Scorpionis
SE	Antares
SEbS	Alpha Centauri
SSE	Canopus
SbE	Achernar
S	Southern Cross

The true position of these stars is only approximate to their theoretical equidistant rhumbs on the sidereal compass. Over time, the elaboration of the pelorus points led to the modern compass rose.

== Modern use ==
In appearance and use, a pelorus resembles a compass or compass repeater, with sighting vanes or a sighting telescope attached, but it has no directive properties. That is, it remains at any relative direction to which it is set. It is generally used by setting 000° at the lubber's line. Relative bearings are then observed. They can be converted to bearings true, magnetic, grid, etc., by adding the appropriate heading. The direct use of relative bearings is sometimes of value. A pelorus is useful, for instance, in determining the moment at which an aid to navigation is broad on the beam. It is also useful in measuring pairs of relative bearings which can be used to determine distance off and distance abeam of a navigational aid.

If the true heading is set at the lubber's line, true bearings are observed directly. Similarly, compass bearings can be observed if the compass heading is set at the lubber's line, etc. However, the vessel must be on the heading to which the pelorus is set if accurate results are to be obtained, or else a correction must be applied to the observed results. Perhaps the easiest way of avoiding error is to have the steersman indicate when the vessel is on course. This is usually done by calling out "mark, mark, mark" as long as the vessel is within a specified fraction of a degree of the desired heading. The observer, who is watching a distant object across the pelorus, selects an instant when the vessel is steady and is on course. An alternative method is to have the observer call out "mark" when the relative bearing is steady, and the steersman note the heading. If the compass is swinging at the moment of observation, the observation should be rejected. The number of degrees between the desired and actual headings is added if the vessel is to the right of the course, and subtracted if to the left. Thus, if the course is 060° and the heading is 062° at the moment of observation, a correction of 2° is added to the bearing.

== See also ==
- Compass rose
- Navigation
- Pilotage
- Rhumbline network
