= Breaking Free (disambiguation) =

"Breaking Free" is a song from the Disney Channel Original Movie High School Musical.

Breaking Free may also refer to:

- The Adventures of Tintin: Breaking Free, an anarchist parody of the popular The Adventures of Tintin series of comics
- Breaking Free, 1995 album by Sugar Minott
- Breaking Free (film), a 2015 documentary film, directed by Sridhar Rangayan

== See also ==
- Break Free (disambiguation)
