= Bena Di Senior =

Jamaican record producer (born 1991)

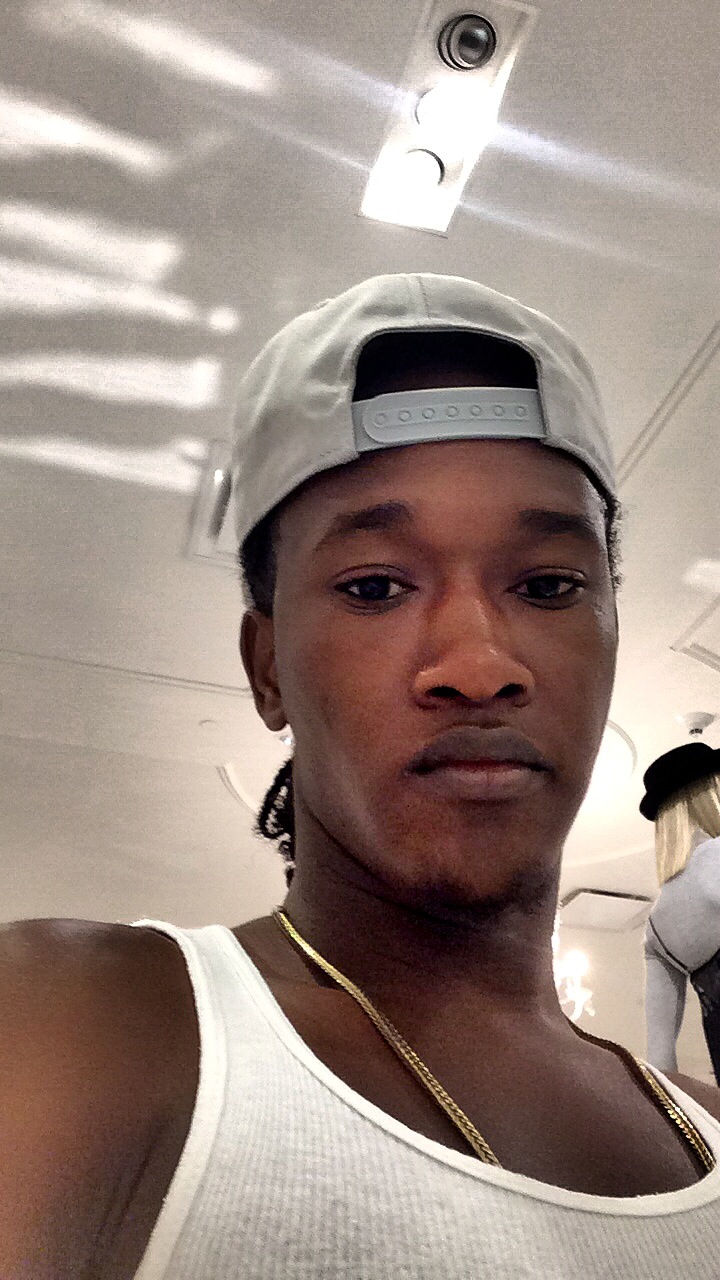
- Haslam in 2014

Background information
- Also known as: Bena Di Senior
- Born: 8 March 1991 (age 35)
- Origin: Kingston Parish, Jamaica
- Genres: Dancehall; reggae; hip-hop; rap
- Occupation: Record producer
- Instrument: Digital audio workstation
- Years active: 2007–present
- Label: Bena Records / Bena Production

Radeem Haslam (born 8 March 1991), professionally known as Bena Di Senior or commonly as Di Senior, is a Jamaican record producer and entrepreneur based in Kingston, Jamaica.

== Biography ==
=== Career highlights ===
Cjking Entertainment featured Haslam on their website for two consecutive weeks in 2011. In 2013, Bena Productions produced Don Andreis's single, "Badness Inna We Longtime" in 2013.

== Discography ==
=== Studio albums and singles ===
- 2009: Crime Scene Riddim – featuring Haslam (various artists)
- 2010: Nuh Seh Nuttin – Watch Di Way She Whine
- 2011: Kalado – Provide "Frass Vybz Riddim"
- 2012: Blue Square Riddim – featuring Haslam (various artists)
- 2013: Strent Ft. Ding Dong – Mad Up Di Party – featuring Haslam (Bomb Shop Records)
- 2013: Under Control Riddim – featuring Haslam (Y-Not Production)
- 2013: Deh Deh – Proud A Mi Money
- 2013: Strent – Big Spliff
- 2014: Bad Dawgs Riddim – featuring Bena Di Senior (Various Artists)
- 2015: Conversion Riddim – featuring Bena Di Senior (Various Artists)
- 2024: Tatik – Defend It
- 2026: Big Back Riddim - Featuring Bena Di Senior (Various Artist)

=== Chart singles ===
Year	Title	Peak Chart Positions		Album
Year	Title	Hype TV Jamaica	Fiwi Choice Top 10	Album
2011	"Party Cup Riddim Medley" (featuring Ding Dong, Tarnado, Zhand-High & Eklypse Sicka)	1	1	Party Cup Riddim
2011	"Provide" (featuring Kalado)	2	4	Frass Vybz Riddim
2014	"Badness Inna We Long Time" (featuring Don Andre)	3	9	Blue Square Riddim
2015	"Conversion Riddim Medley" (featuring Versatile, Tactikal, Don Vital & Eklypse)	17	–	Conversion Riddim

== Filmography ==
Films & Music Video
Year	Title	Role	Notes
2009	Party Cup Riddim Medley	Himself	First video appearance
2011	Kalado – Provide (music video)	Himself	Produced by Bena Di Senior
2012	Don Andre – Badness Inna We Long Time (music video)	Himself	Produced by Bena Di Senior
2014	Blingazz – Party Fi Di Year (music video)	Himself	Produced by Bena Di Senior
2015	Conversion Riddim Medley (music video)	Himself	Produced by Bena Di Senior and Y-Not Production

== Awards and nominations ==
=== HDP Music Awards ===
The HDP Music Awards were established in 2012 by DJ Frass Vybz to celebrate dancehall performers, producers, and music video directors.

Year	Nominated work	Award	Result
2013	Frass Vybz Riddim EP	Producer of the Year	Nominated

== Influences ==
In various interviews and blog posts, Haslam has named a number of musical influences on his own production work.

=== Dancehall / reggae ===
- Stephen Di Genius Mcgregor
- Sly & Robbie
- Philip "Fatis" Burrell
- Tony "CD" Kelly
- Don Corleon
- Jordon Mclure & Isle Mclure (Chimney Records)

=== Hip-hop ===
- Ace Hood
- Future (rapper)
- Rick Ross
- Meek Mill
- T.I
- Safaree Samuels

=== Hip-hop / rap producers ===
- Young Chop
- Mike Will Made It
- Lex Luger (record producer)
- Timbaland
- Dr. Dre
- 40 OVO
- London on da Track
