= Kalado =

Jamaican reggae and dancehall deejay (born 1984)

- Also known as: Kalado
- Born: Eton Gordon; Unknown
- Origin: Kingston, Jamaica
- Genres: Reggae, Dancehall
- Occupation: Recording Artist
- Years active: 2008–present
- Label: (KOG) Knock Out Gang
- Website: https://m.youtube.com/channel/UCZFhCpTuGBKLGYvdmQ4TwSQ

Kalado is a Jamaican reggae and dancehall deejay. He is a member of the Bounty Killer founded collective Alliance and the founder of KOG Records. In April 2018, Gordon signed an executive booking agreement with New York-based Donsome Booking Agency which is operated by Adrian "Donsome" Hanson.

== Early life and career ==
Gordon was born in the Maxfield Park area of Kingston but moved to Clarendon Parish, Jamaica at the age of four, along with his mother and siblings. At the age of 16, he graduated from Edwin Allen High School with a Caribbean Examinations Council Distinction for Art & Craft. After graduation, Gordon returned to Kingston began recording.

Kalado has cited Lil Wayne, Bounty Killer, Assassin, Drake, and Shabba Ranks as influences.

In 2008, Gordon caught the eye and ear of a judge on the Magnum Kings and Queens of Dancehall show, and was invited to compete.

In 2009, Kalado's released "Badmind a Kill Dem", on his own G-Law Records, but it was his single "Sad Streets" that yielded a #1 video on HYPE TV, as well as a mixtape of the same name. In 2011, Kalado also released another single that created a buzz on the airways titled "Provide" produced by the young and talented dancehall producer Bena Di Senior.

In 2011, Gordon was invited by Bounty Killer to become a member of his latest crew of rising dancehall artists, Alliance Next Generation.

== Mixtapes ==
- "Sad Streets" (2010)
- "The Story" (2013)
