= Entrepreneur (disambiguation) =

An entrepreneur is someone who designs, launches, and runs a new business.

Entrepreneur may also refer to:

- Entrepreneur (horse), a racehorse
- Entrepreneur (magazine), a business magazine
- Entrepreneur (video game), a 1997 business simulation video game
- "Entrepreneur", a song on the album History: Function Music by E-40
- The Entrepreneur, a 2011 film

== See also ==
- "Entrapreneur", a 2023 song by Central Cee
