= Christina Grand =

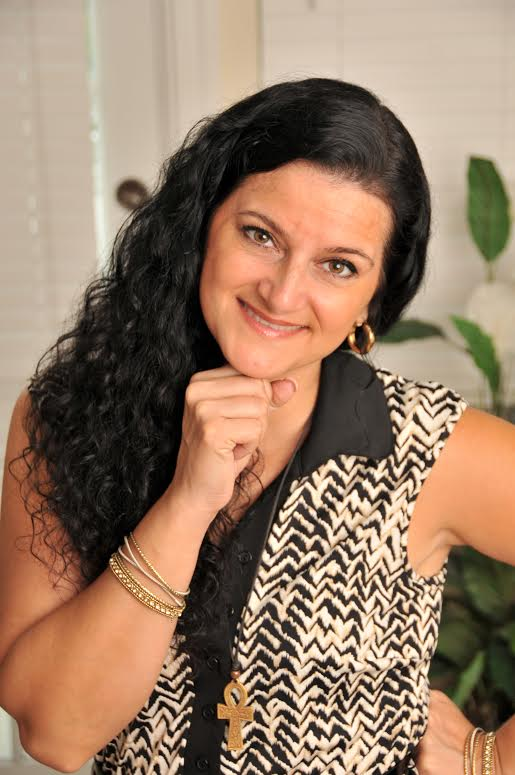

Background information
- Birth name: Christina Grand
- Born: New Jersey, United States
- Origin: American / Hispano-Arab
- Occupation(s): Musician, music executive, record producer
- Years active: 2000–present
- Website: christinagrand.com

Christina Grand was born February 17 in New Jersey, United States. She started working in the music industry in 1996 by assisting promoters, record labels and club owners with business operations and marketing. The Worldwide Reggae Embassy™: In 2011, she began to diligently produce songs for the organization's clients such as Eldie Anthony, Ma'Niche, Cameal Davis, C-Zer, I-Noble, Tajji, Fyah Stain, and Blakk Sparrow.

She has produced for music composer such as Roadz (London, England), Asha D Records (Leeds, England), Steve Richards (Leeds, England), El Toro (Russia), K-Swizz (Jamaica), Mantis the Producer (Jamaica) and DJ Lanz 876 (Jamaica). The Worldwide Reggae Embassy™: she was contracted in 2011 as the Senior Executive Music Industry Trainer for the Music Embassies and have educated countless individuals worldwide in the Music Industry Training sessions that are offered by the Music Embassies.

== Discography ==
- 2014: Music Embassies Spotlight (Album)

== Albums ==
This chart lists every artist who has appeared in at least three different albums by Christina Grand (including bonus tracks and remixes). Her most frequent collaborator is Eldie Anthony, who has appeared on seven songs, on Christina's first album.

Artist	Music Embassies Spotlight, Vol. 1	Music Embassies Spotlight, Vol. 2	Total
Eldie Anthony	Yes		1
Ma'Niche	Yes		1
Cameal Davis	Yes		1
C-Zer	Yes		1
I-Noble	Yes		1

Studio singles & albums

Music Embassies Spotlight, Vol. 1

- 1 Eldie Anthony – Break Free
- 2 C-Zer & Cameal Davis – Dreaming
- 3 Ma'Niche – Thank You
- 4 Eldie Anthony – Singing in the Rain
- 5 Cameal Davis – I Love Ya
- 6 I-Noble – Rich and Wealthy
- 7 Eldie Anthony – Jah Is by My Side
- 8 Cameal Davis – Don't Give Up
- 9 Eldie Anthony & I-Noble – Living for Tomorrow
- 10 Ma'Niche – Start Over
- 11 C-Zer – Life
- 12 Eldie Anthony – Let Me Be Your Man
- 13 I-Noble – Mama Cry (Garrison Anthem)
- 14 I-Noble – Knight in Shining Armour
- 15 Eldie Anthony – I Will Go On
- 16 Ma'Niche – I'm Notorious
- 17 C-Zer & Ma'Niche – Dancefloor Fantasy (feat. Tajji)
- 18 I-Noble & Ma'Niche – The Way I Move
- 19 Eldie Anthony & Ma'Niche – Dance If You're Dancing
- 20 Cameal Davis – Wanna Dance

== BMI ==
- 2011: "*Christina huge victory with BMI
- 2011: "*Christina with BMI 2011"
