= Eklypse Sicka =

- Also known as: Eklypse
- Born: Keniel Flowers
- Origin: Kingston, Jamaica
- Genres: Reggae, Dancehall
- Years active: 2006–present
- Labels: Icon Music Group (IMG Productions), Bena Records, Salifade Digital Ent
- Website: Official Website

Keniel Flowers (born 17 February) better known by his stage name Eklypse Sicka or simply Eklypse is a Jamaican Reggae & Dancehall singer and songwriter.

== Early life and career ==
Eklypse grew up in the Nannyville Gardens neighborhood of Kingston, Jamaica. He attended Mona High School where he was a stand out footballer, earning a football scholarship to Dunoon Technical College. After graduating from college Eklypse went on to play in the Jamaica National Premier League for Arnett Gardens F.C. & August Town F.C. as a midfielder. In 2006 Eklypse decided to follow is true calling and started to write music. Later that same year he recorded "The Nannyville Anthem" which earned him the respect of the community as a recording artist. Shortly after he met Donald "Icon" Medler, and they formed a strong friendship that resulted in Icon being the main producer for him at the time. Through the years Eklypse with the assistance of Icon have built the first recording studio in the Nannyville community and formed Icon Music Group (I.M.G). He is now teamed up and working with Michael McFade, his Business Manager and owner of Salifade Digital Entertainment and Management.
