= Lubber line =

Nautical navigational aid

A lubber line, also known as a lubber's line, is a fixed line on the binnacle of a compass, or a plan position indicator radar display, pointing towards the front of the ship or aircraft, and corresponding to the craft's centerline (being the customary direction of movement).

The line represents 0 degrees and is therefore the zero point from which relative bearings are measured, e.g., "twenty degrees to port".

Compasses on sailboats may have additional lubber lines at forty-five degrees from the centerline. This represents about as close to the wind as the average boat will sail. These lubber lines may be used when sailing close hauled to see if one is on the closest course to the destination, without having to add or subtract the 45 degrees every few minutes, or recalculate the required heading every time one tacks. The main line on the compass reads your current (close-hauled) heading and the leeward lubber line will read the bearing to the destination, regardless of whether you are on port or starboard tack. Lubber lines also help show windshifts when racing. When sailing close-hauled with good trim and the bearing to the windward mark starts to drift outside the lubber line (angle becoming greater than 45 degrees) one is being headed, and should consider tacking.

Directional gyros on aircraft also have additional 45-degree lubber lines. These are useful for intercepting tracks and making procedure turns.

== Etymology ==
The name comes from "lubber", a nautical term for a novice sailor or landlubber. It has also been called a lubber's mark or lubber's point, though use of these terms declined in the 20th century.
