= Isopar M =

Names
- Other names: C13-C14 isoparafin; C13-C14 isoalkane; Distillates (petroleum), hydrotreated light; Hydrotreated light distillate (petroleum)

Identifiers
CAS Number	64742-47-8
UNII	E4F12ROE70

Properties
Appearance	Colorless liquid
Melting point	−58 °C (−72 °F; 215 K)
Boiling point	175–270 °C (347–518 °F; 448–543 K)
Solubility in water	Negligible

Hazards
Flash point	80.5 °C (176.9 °F)
- Except where otherwise noted, data are given for materials in their standard state (at 25 °C [77 °F], 100 kPa). Infobox references

Isopar M is a nearly clear odorless petroleum distillate and solvent produced by ExxonMobil. It is created from crude oil. It has a flash point of more than 60 °C (140 °F), and works as a forming fluid in metalworking, as a household cleaner, a household polisher, and a liquid vaporizer.

By weight, it consists of:

	Straight-chain	Branched	Cyclic
C11 alkanes	0.001%	0.42%	0.08%
C12 alkanes	0.02%	6.38%	1.21%
C13 alkanes	0.04%	18.63%	3.53%
C14 alkanes	0.10%	41.53%	7.87%
C15 alkanes	0.03%	13.59%	2.58%
C16 alkanes	0.01%	3.36%	0.64%
