= Thomas S. Negus (pilot boat) =

Sandy Hook Pilot boat

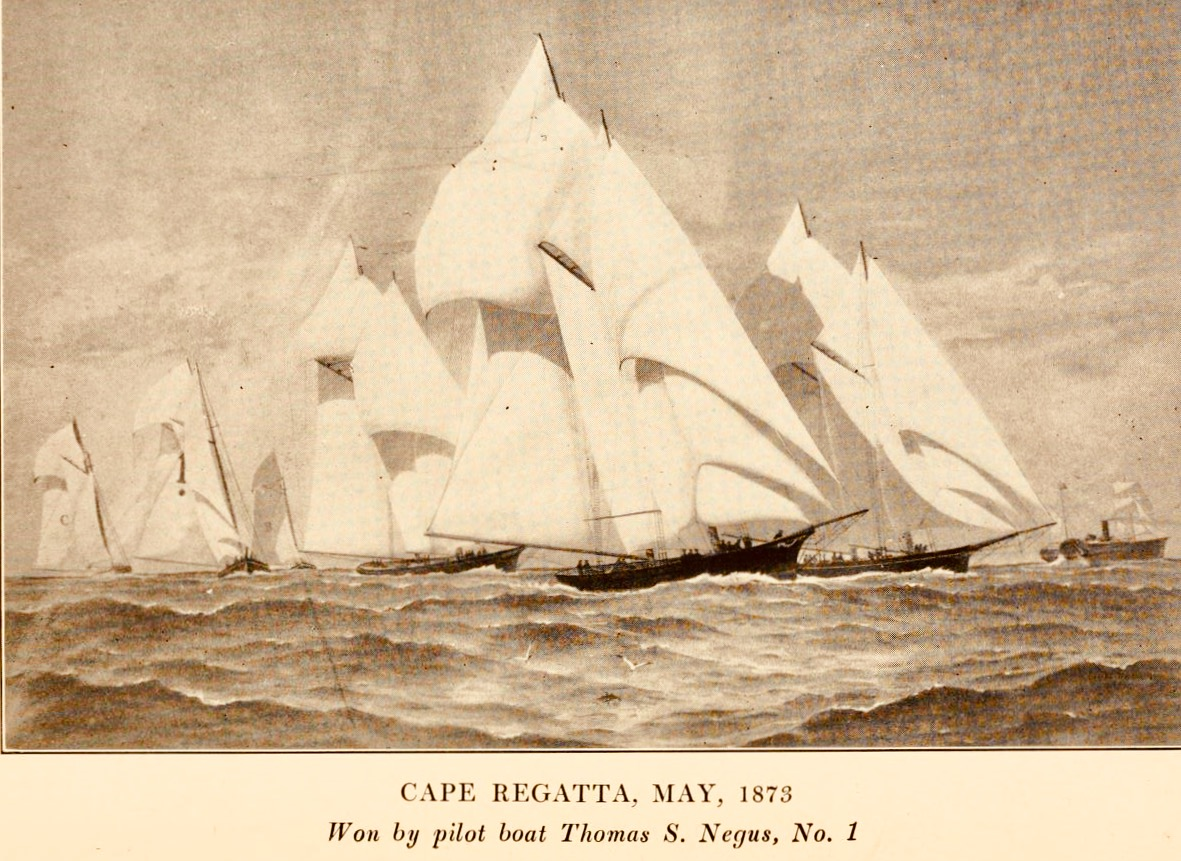
- Over the Cape May Course, 1873; Won by pilot boat Thomas S. Negus, No. 1.

History

United States
- Name: Thomas S. Negus
- Namesake: Thomas S. Negus
- Owner: N. J. Pilots
- Operator: Captain John Cooper
- Builder: C. & R. Poillon
- Launched: September 24, 1873
- Out of service: November 4, 1897
- Fate: Sold

General characteristics
- Class & type: schooner
- Tonnage: 68-tons TM
- Length: 85 ft 2 in (25.96 m)
- Beam: 20 ft 5 in (6.22 m)
- Draft: 10 ft 6 in (3.20 m)
- Depth: 8 ft 6 in (2.59 m)
- Propulsion: Sail
- Notes: Used log rails instead of bulwarks

The Thomas S. Negus was a 19th-century two-masted Sandy Hook pilot boat, built by C. & R. Poillon shipyard in Brooklyn in 1873 for the New Jersey maritime pilots. She was built to replace the pilot boat Jane, No. 1, which sank in early 1873. She was the winner of a $1,000 prize at the Cape May Regatta in 1873. She was named for Thomas S. Negus, president of the N. J. Pilots' Commissioners. In 1897, she left the pilot service to prospect for gold during the Klondike Gold Rush.

== Construction and service ==
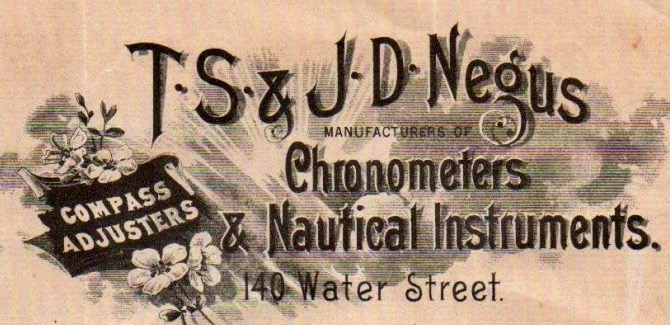
T.S. & J.D. Negus Company

New Jersey pilot-boat Thomas S. Negus, No. 1, was launched on September 24, 1873, from the C. & R. Poillon shipyardat the foot of Bridge Street in Brooklyn, New York. She was built to replace the pilot-boat Jane, No. 1, of the New Jersey Pilots' Association fleet, which was lost in 1873.

Negus was registered with the Record of American and Foreign Shipping from 1876 to 1900 with Captain William Lewis as master and N. J. Pilots as the owners. She was named for Thomas S. Negus, president of the board of Commissioners of Pilotage of New Jersey. On October 31, 1893, the Negus was listed as one of eight New Jersey Sandy Hook pilot boats.

On October 9, 1873, the Thomas S. Negus won a notable victory over her competitors in the Cape May Regatta, which was a race from Owl's Head Point around to Cape May Lighthouse in New Jersey, and back to the Sandy hook Lightship. The race was sponsored by Joseph F. Loubat, who was a yachtsman, that offered the Bennett cup and $1,000 for first place. Captain William Lewis sailed the Negus during the race. Thomas S. Negus, of the N. J. Pilots' Commissioners, was one of the invited guests on board the Negus during the race. Negus later wrote: "Arrived at the Lightship off Sandy Hook at 8 h. 49 m. 30s. A. M. Hailed Judges on board, who informed us we were the second boat in, The Enchantress only being ahead of us." The pilot-boat Enchantress won the first prize, the Thomas S. Negus, No. 1 won the $1,000 second prize, and pilot-boat James W. Elwell, No. 7, won the third prize. Of the pilot-boats, the Negus took first place with the Widgeon second, the Fish third, the Elwell fourth, and the Blunt last.

On October 18, 1878, the pilot-boat T. S. Negus, No. 1 carried survivors to Stonington, Connecticut, after being transferred from the Isaac Webb. The Webb, had rescued the crew of the whaling bark Sarah, of New Bedford, Massachusetts, on October 16, 1878, forty miles south of Black Island with three survivors. Twenty-two of the crew perished. The Sarah had been caught up in a hurricane and was lying on its side, a floating wreck.

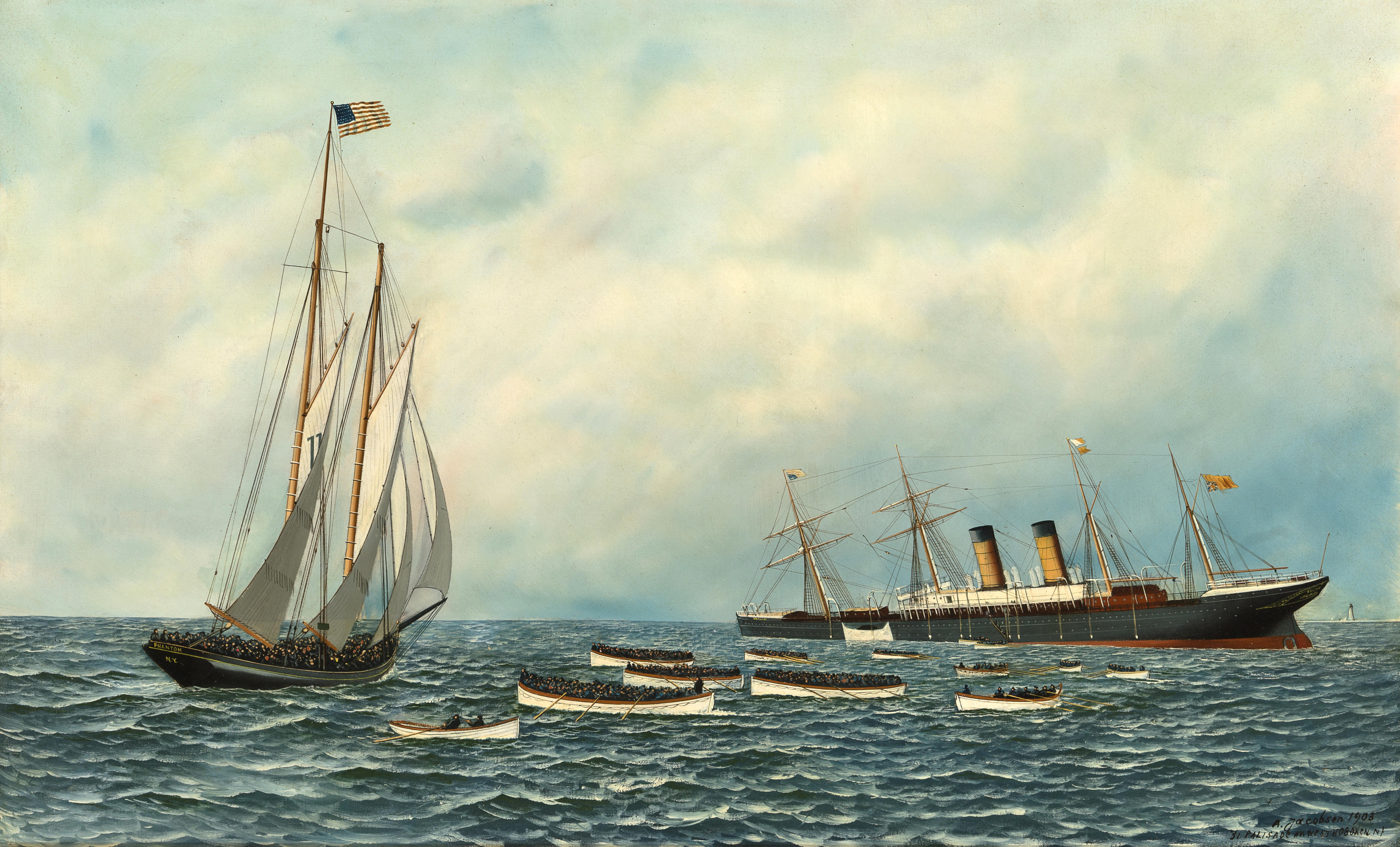
The Sinking of the S.S. Oregon.

On March 19, 1886, the New Jersey pilot-boat Thomas S. Negus No. 1, picked up sixty bags of mail from the Cunard Line passenger steamer SS Oregon, that sank after being hit by a three-masted coal schooner off Fire Island with 845 people on board. Captain William Lewis of the Negus picked up a mail bag that contained $250,000 of Erie second consolidated bonds, several boxes or oranges and a satchel belonging to G. S. Frances. All the letters were in good condition. The pilot-boat Phantom helped to rescue 400 passengers and crew.

On February 10, 1895, Pilot-boat Thomas S. Negus, was blown out to sea because of a blizzard. Pilot John Hall came back to port on the White Star freighter Cevic. The Negus broke her foreboom but survived the storm.

== End of service ==
At the time when sail was abandoned for steam, the T. S. Negus was sold to Captain Joseph McClure as a pilot-boat. He changed her rig from pilot boat to schooner. On November 4, 1897, the pilot-boat Thomas S. Negus left for Klonkike in Yukon in north-western Canada. Captain Joseph McClure and a company of eight men left New Haven, Connecticut, to prospect for gold. They traveled through the Strait of Magellan in southern Chile to reach the Pacific Ocean.

On June 8, 1898, pilot-boat T. S. Negus arrived in San Francisco after she returned from Cook Inlet in south-central Alaska, where she disembarked twenty-five passengers. The boat was sold to Frank J. Mauka because the owners wanted to remain in Alaska. On April 25, 1899, the schooner T. S. Negus arrived in Hawaii from Columbia, San Diego. Her owner was Frank J. Mauka.

== See also ==
- List of Northeastern U. S. Pilot Boats
