= Gioja =

Gioja may refer to:

- Gioja (crater), a lunar crater
- Camillo Gioja Barbera, 19th-century Italian painter
- César Gioja (born 1945), Argentine politician
- Flavio Gioja (born c. 1300), probable Italian mariner and inventor
- José Luis Gioja (born 1949), Argentine politician

== See also ==
- Gioia (disambiguation)
