= History of the compass =

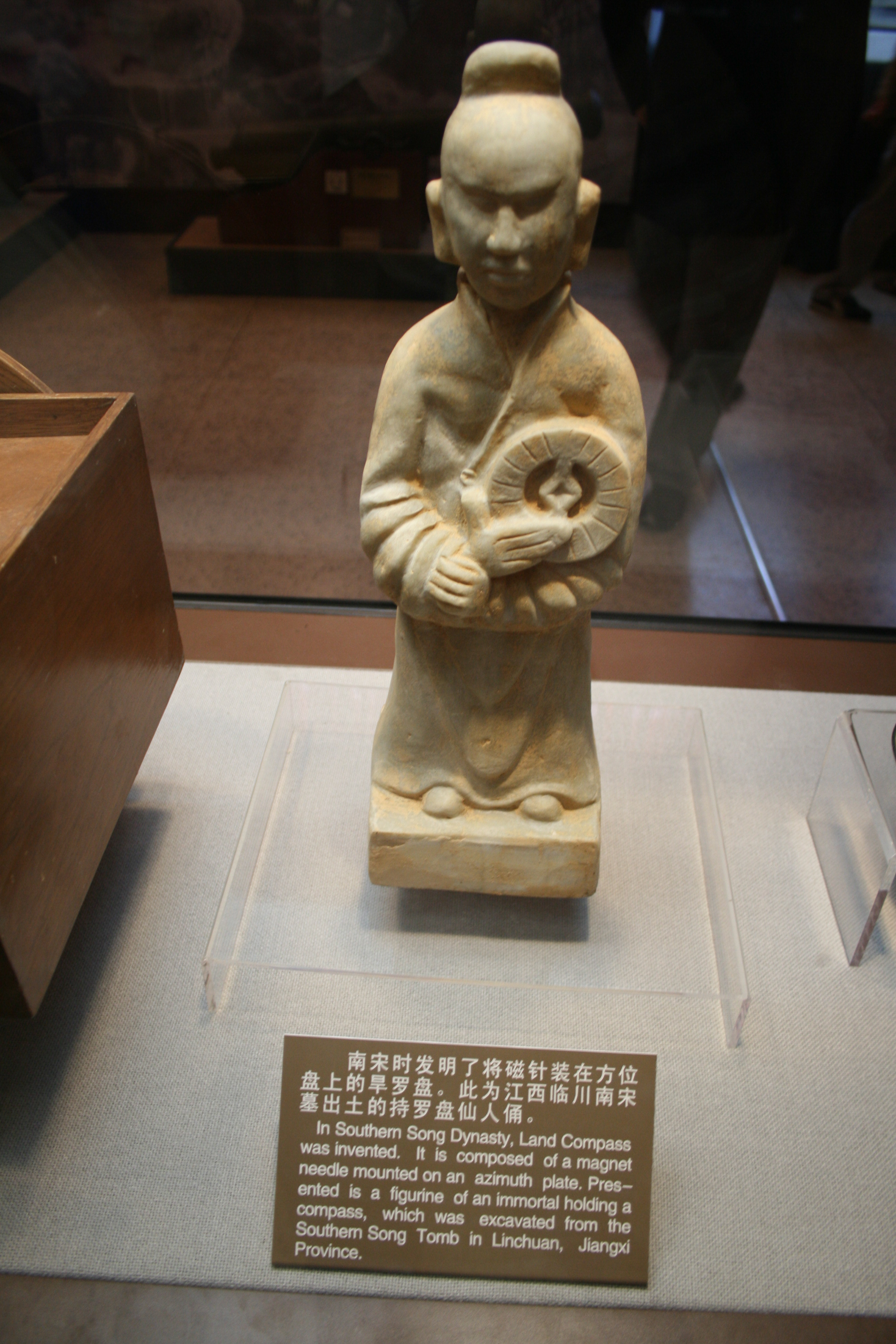
Song dynasty figurine of a man holding a compass

The compass is a magnetometer used for navigation and orientation that shows direction in regard to the geographic cardinal points. The structure of a compass consists of the compass rose, which displays the four main directions on it: East (E), South (S), West (W) and North (N). The angle increases in the clockwise position. North corresponds to 0°, east is 90°, south is 180° and west is 270°.

The history of the compass started more than 2,000 years ago during the Han dynasty (202 BC – 220 AD). The first compasses were made of lodestone, a naturally magnetized stone of iron, in Han dynasty China. It was called the "South Pointing Fish" and was used for land navigation by the mid-11th century during the Song dynasty (960–1279 AD). Shen Kuo provided the first explicit description of a magnetized needle in 1088 and Zhu Yu mentioned its use in maritime navigation in the text Pingzhou Table Talks, dated 1111–1117. Later compasses were made of iron needles, magnetized by striking them with a lodestone. Magnetized needles and compasses were first described in medieval Europe by the English theologian Alexander Neckam (1157–1217 AD). The first literary description of a compass in Western Europe was recorded in around 1190 and in the Islamic world 1232. Dry compasses begin appearing around 1269 in medieval Europe and 1300 in the medieval Islamic world. This was replaced in the early 20th century by the liquid-filled magnetic compass.

== Navigation prior to the compass ==
Before the introduction of the compass, geographical position and direction at sea were primarily determined by the sighting of landmarks, supplemented with the observation of the position of celestial bodies. Other techniques included sampling mud from the seafloor (China), analyzing the flight path of birds, and observing wind, sea debris, and sea state (Polynesia and elsewhere). Objects that have been understood as having been used for navigation by measuring the angles between celestial objects were discovered in the Indus Valley site of Lothal. The Norse are believed to have used a type of sun compass to locate true north. On cloudy days, the Norse may have used cordierite or some other birefringent crystal to determine the sun's direction and elevation from the polarization of daylight; their astronomical knowledge was sufficient to let them use this information to determine their proper heading. The invention of the compass made it possible to determine a heading when the sky was overcast or foggy, and when landmarks were not in sight. This enabled mariners to navigate safely far from land, increasing sea trade, and contributing to the Age of Discovery.

== Geomancy and Feng Shui ==
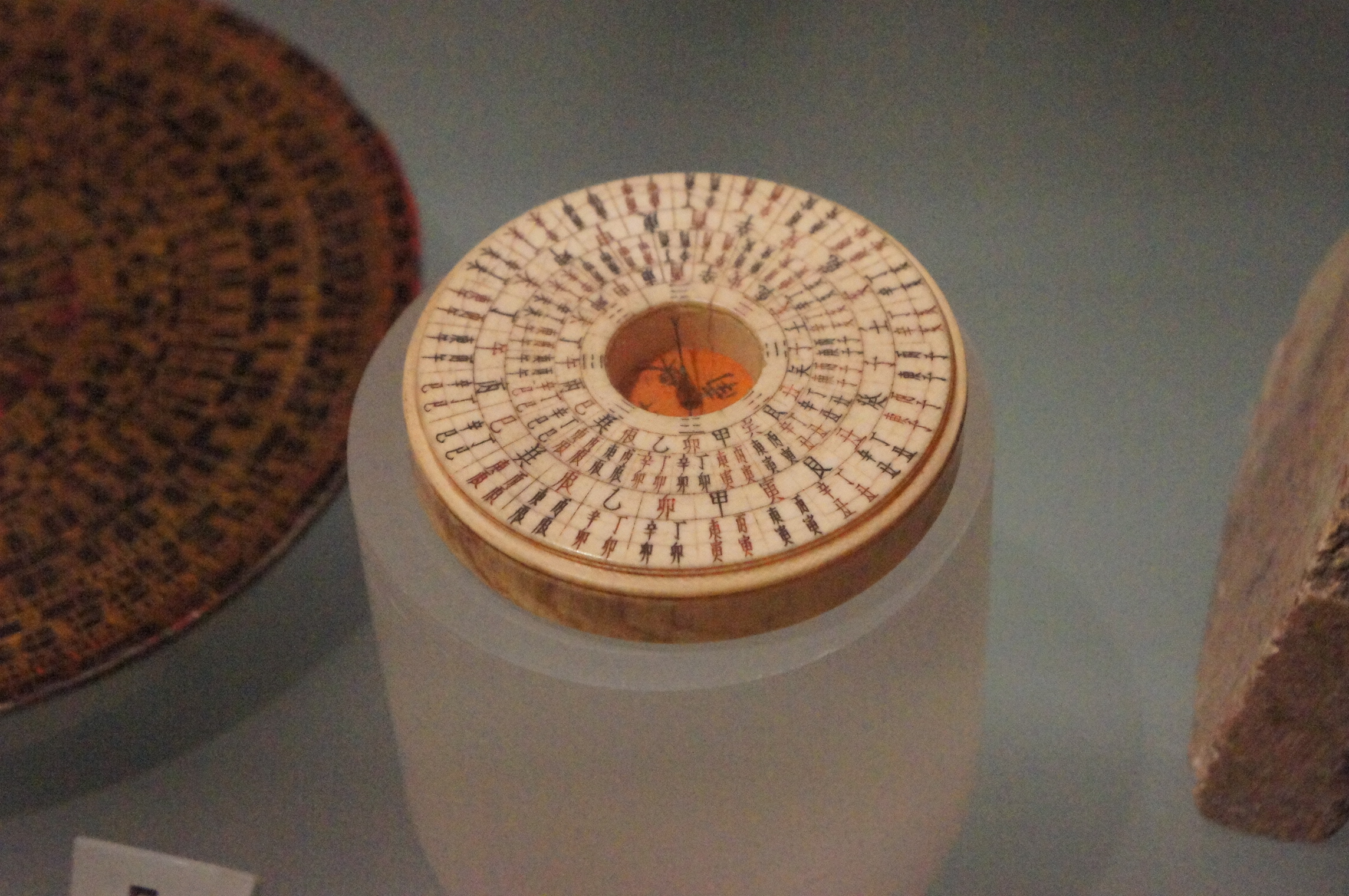
Chinese geomantic compass c. 1760 from the National Maritime Museum in London

The compass was invented in China during the Han dynasty between the 2nd century BC and 1st century AD where it was called the "south-governor" (sīnán 司南) or "South Pointing Fish" (指南魚). The magnetic compass was not, at first, used for navigation, but for geomancy and fortune-telling by the Chinese. The earliest Chinese magnetic compasses were possibly used to order and harmonize buildings by the geomantic principles of feng shui. These early compasses were made with lodestone, a form of the mineral magnetite that is a naturally occurring magnet and aligns itself with the Earth's magnetic field. People in ancient China discovered that if a lodestone was suspended so it could turn freely, it would always point toward the magnetic poles. Early compasses were used to choose areas suitable for building houses, growing crops, and to search for rare gems. Compasses were later adapted for navigation during the Song dynasty in the 11th century.

Based on Krotser and Coe's discovery of an Olmec hematite artifact in Mesoamerica, radiocarbon dated to 1400–1000 BC, astronomer John Carlson has hypothesized that the Olmec might have used the geomagnetic lodestone earlier than 1000 BC for geomancy, a method of divination, which if proven true, predates the Chinese use of magnetism for feng shui by a millennium. Carlson speculates that the Olmecs used similar artifacts as a directional device for astronomical or geomantic purposes but does not suggest navigational usage. The artifact is part of a polished hematite bar with a groove at one end, possibly used for sighting. Carlson's claims have been disputed by other scientific researchers, who have suggested that the artifact is actually a constituent piece of a decorative ornament and not a purposely built compass. Several other hematite or magnetite artifacts have been found at pre-Columbian archaeological sites in Mexico and Guatemala.

== Early navigational compass ==
A number of early cultures used lodestone so they could turn, as magnetic compasses for navigation. Early mechanical compasses are referenced in written records of the Chinese, who began using it for navigation "some time before 1050, possibly as early as 850." At present, according to Kreutz, scholarly consensus is that the Chinese invention used in navigation pre-dates the first European mention of a compass by 150 years. The first recorded appearance of the use of the compass in Europe (1190) is earlier than in the Muslim world (1232), as a description of a magnetized needle and its use among sailors occurs in Alexander Neckam's De naturis rerum (On the Natures of Things), written in 1190.

However, there are questions over diffusion. Some historians suggest that the Arabs introduced the compass from China to Europe. Some suggested the compass was transmitted from China to Europe and the Islamic world via the Indian Ocean, or was brought by the crusaders to Europe from China. However, some scholars have proposed an independent European invention of the compass.

=== Sinan ===
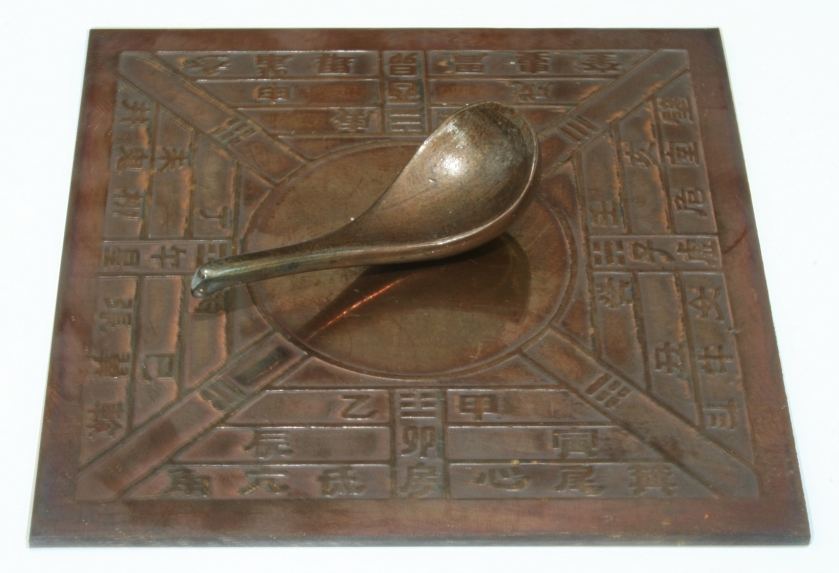
Model of a Han dynasty (206 BC–220 AD) south-indicating ladle or sinan made of magnetized lodestones.

These are noteworthy Chinese literary references in evidence for its antiquity:

- The magnetic compass was first invented as a device for divination as early as the Chinese Han dynasty and Tang dynasty (since about 206 BC). The compass was used in Song dynasty China by the military for navigational orienteering by 1040–44, and was used for maritime navigation by 1111 to 1117.
- The earliest Chinese literature reference to magnetism lies in the 4th century BC writings of Wang Xu (鬼谷子): "The lodestone attracts iron." The book also notes that the people of the state of Zheng always knew their position using a "south-pointer"; some authors suggest that this refers to early use of the compass.
- The first mention of a spoon, speculated to be a lodestone, observed "pointing in a cardinal direction" is a Chinese work composed between 70 and 80 AD (Lunheng), which records that "But when the south-pointing spoon is thrown upon the ground, it comes to rest pointing at the south." Within the text, the author Wang Chong describes the spoon as a phenomenon that he has personally observed. Although the passage does not explicitly mention magnetism, according to Chen-Cheng Yih, the "device described by Wang Chong has been widely considered to be the earliest form of the magnetic compass."
- The first clear account of magnetic declination occurs in the Kuan Shih Ti Li Chih Meng ("Mr. Kuan's Geomantic Instructor"), dating to 880. Another text, the Chiu Thien Hsuan Nu Chhing Nang Hai Chio Ching ("Blue Bag Sea Angle Manual") from around the same period, also has an implicit description of magnetic declination. It has been argued that this knowledge of declination requires the use of the compass.
- A reference to a magnetized needle as a "mysterious needle" appears in 923–926 in the Chung Hua Ku Chin Chu text written by Ma Kao. The same passage is also attributed to the 4th-century AD writer Tshui Pao, although it is postulated that the former text is more authentic. The shape of the needle is compared to that of a tadpole and may indicate the transition between "lodestone spoons" and "iron needles."
- The earliest reference to a specific magnetic "direction finder" device for land navigation is recorded in a Song dynasty book dated to 1040–44. There is a description of an iron "south-pointing fish" floating in a bowl of water, aligning itself to the south. The device is recommended as a means of orientation "in the obscurity of the night." The Wujing Zongyao (武經總要, "Collection of the Most Important Military Techniques") stated: "When troops encountered gloomy weather or dark nights, and the directions of space could not be distinguished...they made use of the [mechanical] south-pointing carriage, or the south-pointing fish." This was achieved by heating of metal (especially if steel), known today as thermoremanence, and would have been capable of producing a weak state of magnetization. While the Chinese achieved magnetic remanence and induction by this time, in both Europe and Asia the phenomenon was attributed to the supernatural and occult, until about 1600 when William Gilbert published his De Magnete.
- The first incontestable reference to a "magnetized needle" in Chinese literature appears in 1088. The Dream Pool Essays, written by the Song dynasty polymath scientist Shen Kuo, contained a detailed description of how geomancers magnetized a needle by rubbing its tip with lodestone and hung the magnetic needle with one single strain of silk with a bit of wax attached to the center of the needle. Shen Kuo pointed out that a needle prepared this way sometimes pointed south, sometimes north.
- The earliest explicit recorded use of a magnetic compass for maritime navigation is found in Zhu Yu's book Pingchow Table Talks (萍洲可談; Pingzhou Ketan) and dates from 1111 to 1117: The ship's pilots are acquainted with the configuration of the coasts; at night they steer by the stars, and in the daytime by the sun. In dark weather they look at the south-pointing needle.
- Earliest recorded description of a dry suspension needle. The Shilin Guang Ji compiled between 1100 and 1250 mentions a wooden turtle suspended by a pin in its concave underbelly that always points north due to a needle attached to its tail.

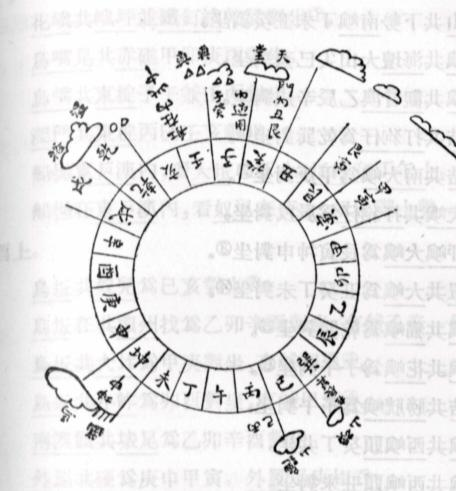
Diagram of a Ming dynasty mariner's compass

Thus, the use of a magnetic compass by the military for land navigation occurred sometime before 1044, but incontestable evidence for the use of the compass as a maritime navigational device did not appear until 1117.

The typical Chinese navigational compass was in the form of a magnetic needle floating in a bowl of water. According to Needham, the Chinese in the Song dynasty and continuing Yuan dynasty did make use of a dry compass, although this type never became as widely used in China as the wet compass. Evidence of this is found in the Shilin Guang Ji ("Guide Through the Forest of Affairs"), published in 1325 by Chen Yuanjing, although its compilation had taken place between 1100 and 1250. The dry compass in China was a dry suspension compass, a wooden frame crafted in the shape of a turtle hung upside down by a board, with the lodestone sealed in by wax, and if rotated, the needle at the tail would always point in the northern cardinal direction. Although the European compass-card in a box frame and dry pivot needle was adopted in China after its use was taken by Japanese pirates in the 16th century (who had, in turn, learned of it from Europeans), the Chinese design of the suspended dry compass persisted in use well into the 18th century. However, according to Kreutz there is only a single Chinese reference to a dry-mounted needle (built into a pivoted wooden tortoise) which is dated to between 1150 and 1250 and claims that there is no clear indication that Chinese mariners ever used anything but the floating needle in a bowl until the 16th century.

The first recorded use of a 48 position mariner's compass on sea navigation was noted in The Customs of Cambodia by Yuan dynasty diplomat Zhou Daguan, he described his 1296 voyage from Wenzhou to Angkor Thom in detail; when his ship set sail from Wenzhou, the mariner took a needle direction of “ding Wei” position, which is equivalent to 22.5 degree SW. After they arrived at Baria, the mariner took "Kun Shen needle", or 52.5 degree SW. Zheng He's Navigation Map, also known as the "Mao Kun Map", contains a large amount of detail "needle records" of Zheng He's expeditions.

=== Medieval Europe ===
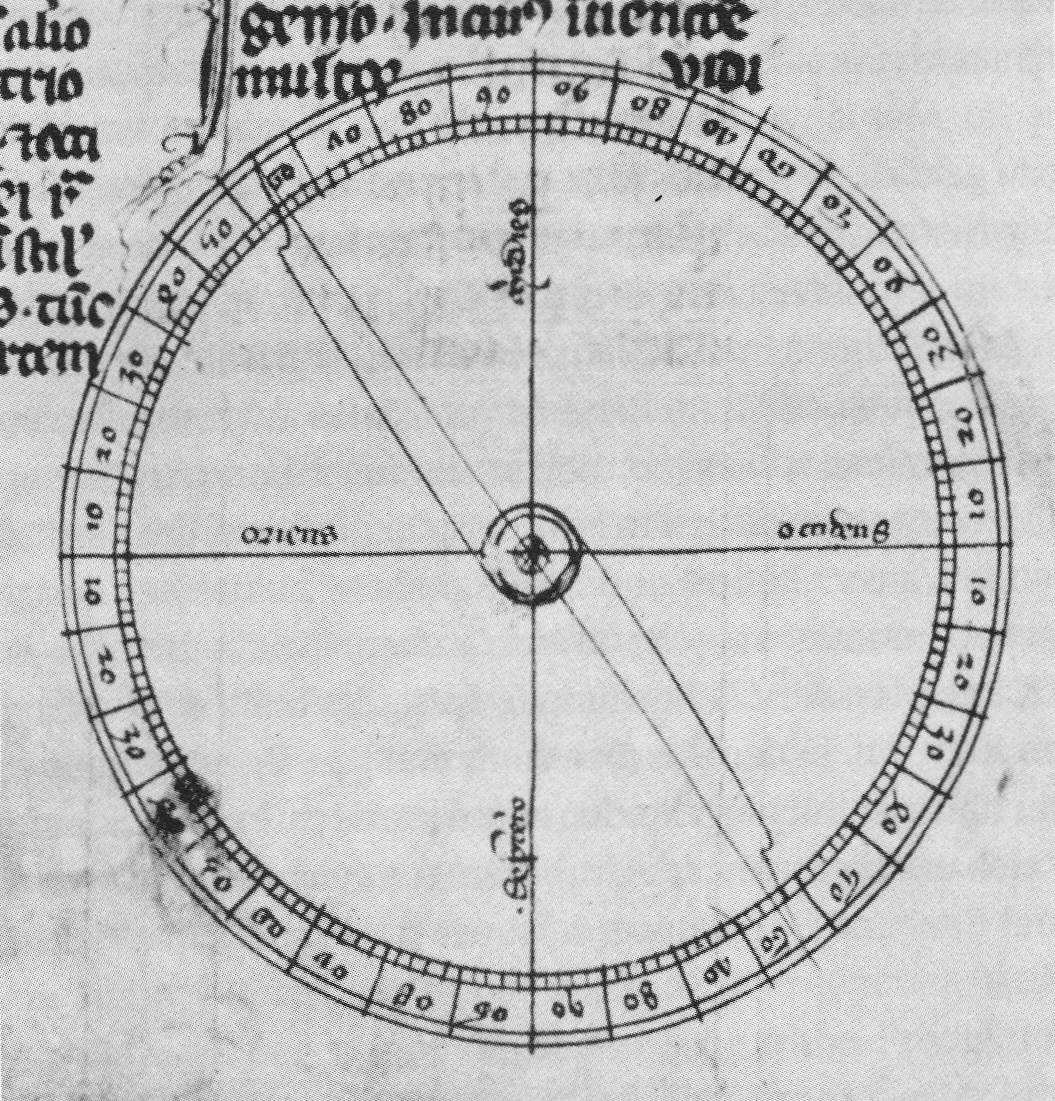
A drawing of a compass in a mid-14th-century copy of Epistola de magnete of Peter Peregrinus.

Alexander Neckam reported the use of a magnetic compass for the region of the English Channel in the texts De utensilibus and De naturis rerum, written between 1187 and 1202, after he returned to England from France and prior to entering the Augustinian abbey at Cirencester. In his 1863 edition of Neckam's De naturis rerum, Thomas Wright provides a translation of the passage in which Neckam mentions sailors being guided by a compass' needle:

The sailors, moreover, as they sail over the sea, when in cloudy whether they can no longer profit by the light of the sun, or when the world is wrapped up in the darkness of the shades of night, and they are ignorant to what point of the compass their ship's course is directed, they touch the magnet with a needle, which (the needle) is whirled round in a circle until, when its motion ceases, its point looks direct to the north.

In 1269 Petrus Peregrinus of Maricourt described a floating compass for astronomical purposes as well as a dry compass for seafaring, in his well-known Epistola de magnete.

In the Mediterranean, the introduction of the compass, at first only known as a magnetized pointer floating in a bowl of water, went hand in hand with improvements in dead reckoning methods, and the development of Portolan charts, leading to more navigation during winter months in the second half of the 13th century. While the practice from ancient times had been to curtail sea travel between October and April, due in part to the lack of dependable clear skies during the Mediterranean winter, the prolongation of the sailing season resulted in a gradual, but sustained increase in shipping movement; by around 1290 the sailing season could start in late January or February, and end in December. The additional few months were of considerable economic importance. For instance, it enabled Venetian convoys to make two round trips a year to the Levant, instead of one.

Between 1295 and 1302, Flavio Gioja converted the compass from a needle floating in water to what we use today, a round box with a compass card that rotates 360 degrees attached to a magnetic element.

At the same time, traffic between the Mediterranean and northern Europe also increased, with the first evidence of direct commercial voyages from the Mediterranean into the English Channel coming in the closing decades of the 13th century, and one factor may be that the compass made traversal of the Bay of Biscay safer and easier. However, critics like Kreutz have suggested that it was later in 1410 that anyone really started steering by compass.

=== Muslim world ===
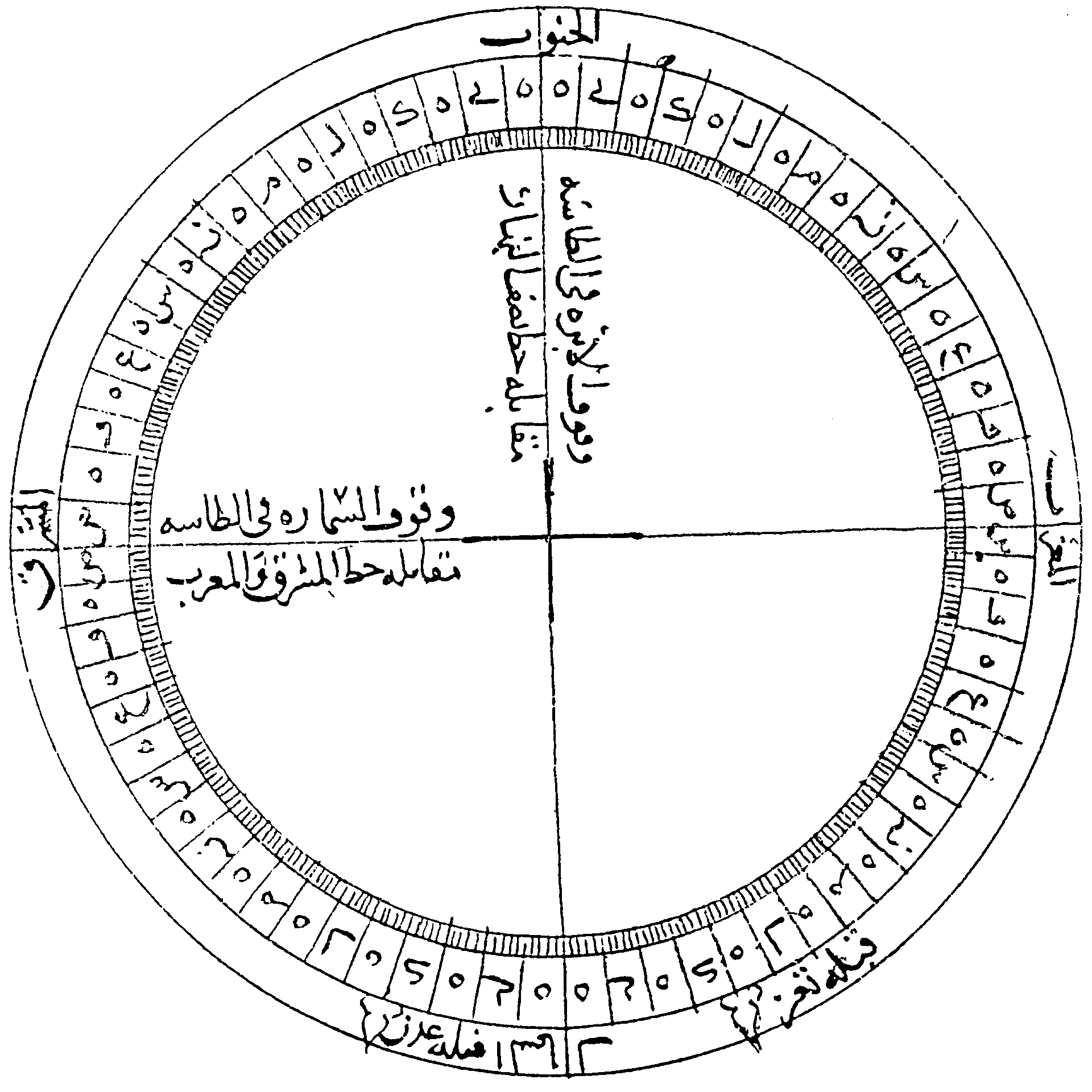
Al-Ashraf's diagram of the compass and Qibla. From MS Cairo TR 105, copied in Yemen, 1293.

The earliest reference to a compass in the Muslim world occurs in a Persian talebook from 1232, Jawami ul-Hikayat, where a compass is used for navigation during a trip in the Red Sea or the Persian Gulf. The fish-shaped iron leaf described indicates that this early Chinese design has spread outside of China. The earliest Arabic reference to a compass, in the form of magnetic needle in a bowl of water, comes from a work by Baylak al-Qibjāqī, written in 1282 while in Cairo. Al-Qibjāqī described a needle-and-bowl compass used for navigation on a voyage he took from Syria to Alexandria in 1242. Since the author describes having witnessed the use of a compass on a ship trip some forty years earlier, some scholars are inclined to antedate its first appearance in the Arab world accordingly. Al-Qibjāqī also reports that sailors in the Indian Ocean used iron fish instead of needles.

Late in the 13th century, the Yemeni Sultan and astronomer al-Malik al-Ashraf described the use of the compass as a "Qibla indicator" to find the direction to Mecca. In a treatise about astrolabes and sundials, al-Ashraf includes several paragraphs on the construction of a compass bowl (ṭāsa). He then uses the compass to determine the north point, the meridian (khaṭṭ niṣf al-nahār), and the Qibla. This is the first mention of a compass in a medieval Islamic scientific text and its earliest known use as a Qibla indicator, although al-Ashraf did not claim to be the first to use it for this purpose.

In 1300, an Arabic treatise written by the Egyptian astronomer and muezzin Ibn Simʿūn describes a dry compass used for determining qibla. Like Peregrinus' compass, however, Ibn Simʿūn's compass did not feature a compass card. In the 14th century, the Syrian astronomer and timekeeper Ibn al-Shatir (1304–1375) invented a timekeeping device incorporating both a universal sundial and a magnetic compass. He invented it for the purpose of finding the times of prayers. Arab navigators also introduced the 32-point compass rose during this time. In 1399, an Egyptian reports two different kinds of magnetic compass. One instrument is a “fish” made of willow wood or pumpkin, into which a magnetic needle is inserted and sealed with tar or wax to prevent the penetration of water. The other instrument is a dry compass.

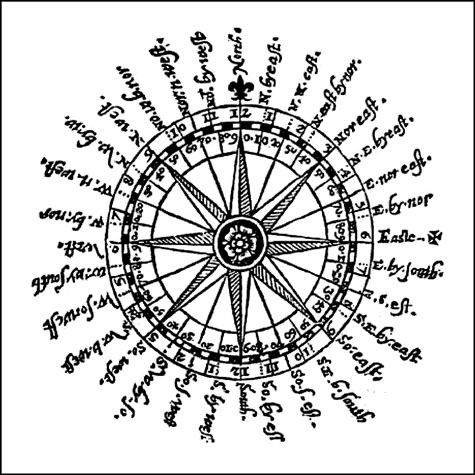
Navigational sailor's compass rose, 1607

In the 15th century, the description given by Ibn Majid while aligning the compass with the pole star indicates that he was aware of magnetic declination. An explicit value for the declination is given by ʿIzz al-Dīn al-Wafāʾī (fl. the 1450s in Cairo).

Pre modern Arabic sources refer to the compass using the term ṭāsa (lit. "bowl") for the floating compass, or ālat al-qiblah ("qibla instrument") for a device used for orienting towards Mecca.

Friedrich Hirth suggested that Arab and Persian traders, who learned about the polarity of the magnetic needle from the Chinese, applied the compass for navigation before the Chinese did. However, Needham described this theory as "erroneous" and "it originates because of a mistranslation" of the term chia-ling found in Zhu Yu's book Pingchow Table Talks.

=== India ===
The development of the magnetic compass is highly uncertain. The compass is mentioned in fourth-century AD Tamil nautical books; moreover, its early name of macchayantra (fish machine) suggest a Chinese origin. In its Indian form, the wet compass often consisted of a fish-shaped magnet, float in a bowl filled with oil.

=== Medieval East Africa ===
There is evidence that the distribution of the compass from China likely also reached eastern Africa by way of trade through the end of the Silk Road that ended in East African centre of trade in Somalia and the Swahili city-state kingdoms. There is evidence that Swahili maritime merchants and sailors acquired the compass at some point and used it for navigation.

== Dry compass ==
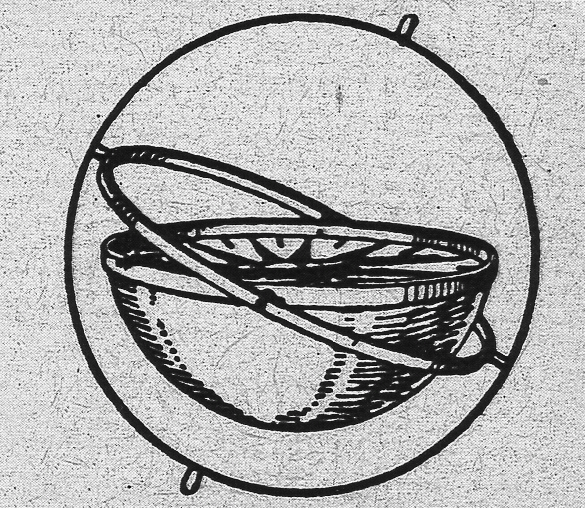
Early modern dry compass suspended by a gimbal (1570)

The dry mariner's compass consists of three elements: A freely pivoting needle on a pin enclosed in a little box with a glass cover and a wind rose, whereby "the wind rose or compass card is attached to a magnetized needle in such a manner that when placed on a pivot in a box fastened in line with the keel of the ship the card would turn as the ship changed direction, indicating always what course the ship was on". Later, compasses were often fitted into a gimbal mounting to reduce grounding of the needle or card when used on the pitching and the rolling deck of a ship.

While pivoting needles in glass boxes had already been described by the French scholar Peter Peregrinus in 1269, and by the Egyptian scholar Ibn Simʿūn in 1300, traditionally Flavio Gioja (fl. 1302), an Italian pilot from Amalfi, has been credited with perfecting the sailor's compass by suspending its needle over a compass card, thus giving the compass its familiar appearance. Such a compass with the needle attached to a rotating card is also described in a commentary on Dante's Divine Comedy from 1380, while an earlier source refers to a portable compass in a box (1318), supporting the notion that the dry compass was known in Europe by then.

== Bearing compass ==
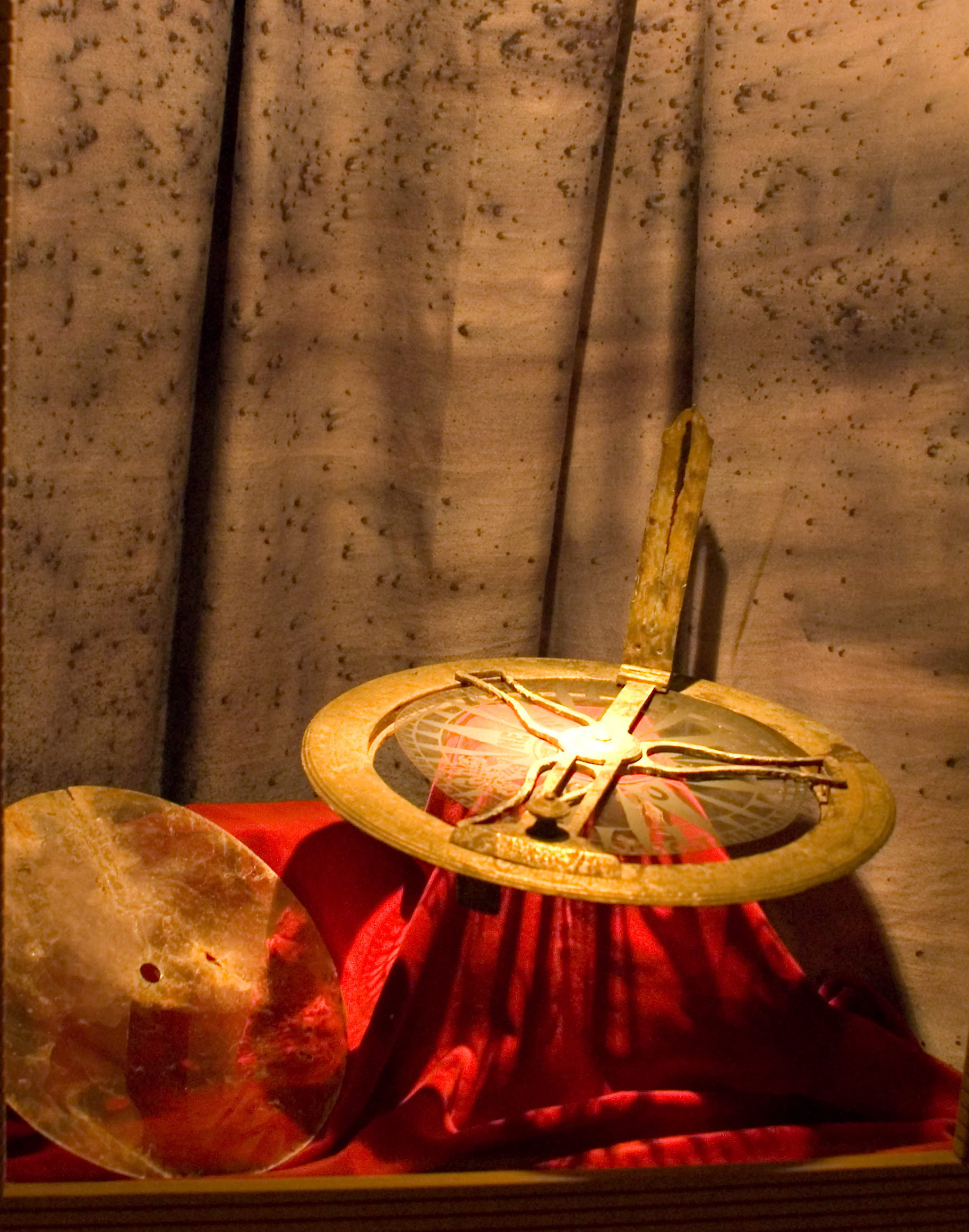
Bearing compass (18th century)

A bearing compass is a magnetic compass mounted in such a way that it allows the taking of bearings of objects by aligning them with the lubber line of the bearing compass. A surveyor's compass is a specialized compass made to accurately measure heading of landmarks and measure horizontal angles to help with map making. These were already in common use by the early 18th century and are described in 1728 Cyclopaedia. The bearing compass was steadily reduced in size and weight to increase portability, resulting in a model that could be carried and operated in one hand. In 1885, a patent was granted for a hand compass fitted with a viewing prism and lens that enabled the user to accurately sight the heading of geographical landmarks, thus creating the prismatic compass. Another sighting method was employing a reflective mirror. First patented in 1902, the Bézard compass consisted of a field compass with a mirror mounted above it. This arrangement enabled the user to align the compass with an objective while simultaneously viewing its bearing in the mirror.

In 1928, Gunnar Tillander, a Swedish unemployed instrument maker and an avid participant in the sport of orienteering, invented a new style of bearing the compass. Dissatisfied with existing field compasses, which required a separate protractor to take bearings from a map, Tillander decided to incorporate both instruments into a single instrument. It combined a compass with a protractor built into the base. His design featured a metal compass capsule containing a magnetic needle with orienting marks mounted into a transparent protractor baseplate with a lubber line (later called a direction of travel indicator). By rotating the capsule to align the needle with the orienting marks, the course bearing could be read at the lubber line. Moreover, by aligning the baseplate with a course drawn on a map – ignoring the needle – the compass could also function as a protractor. Tillander took his design to fellow orienteers Björn, Alvin, and Alvar Kjellström, who were selling basic compasses, and the four men modified Tillander's design. In December 1932, the Silva Company was formed with Tillander and the three Kjellström brothers, and the company began manufacturing and selling its Silva orienteering compass to Swedish orienteers, outdoorsmen, and army officers.

== Liquid compass ==
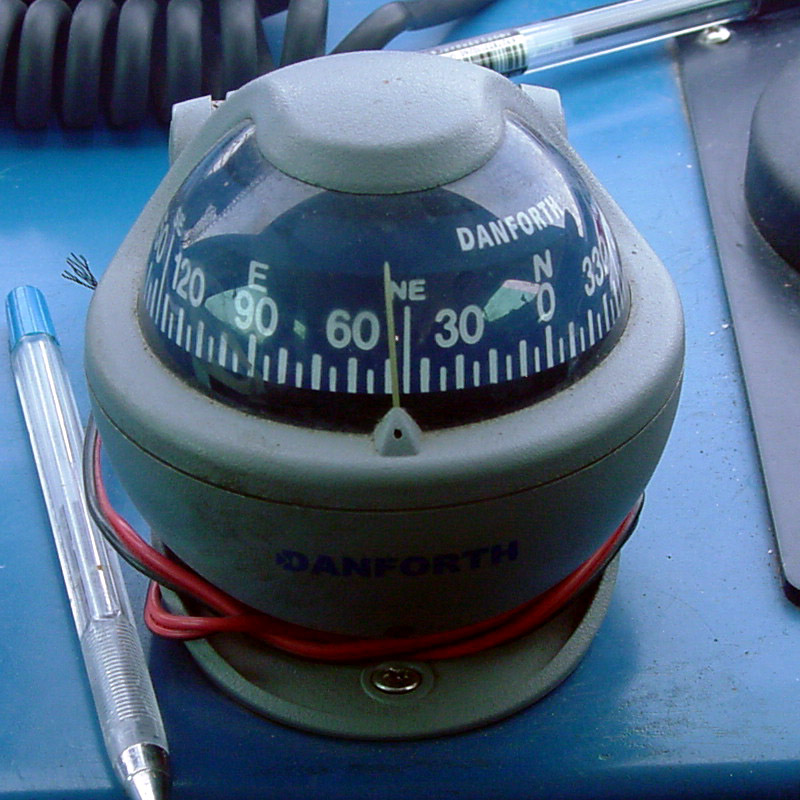
A surface liquid-filled compass on a boat

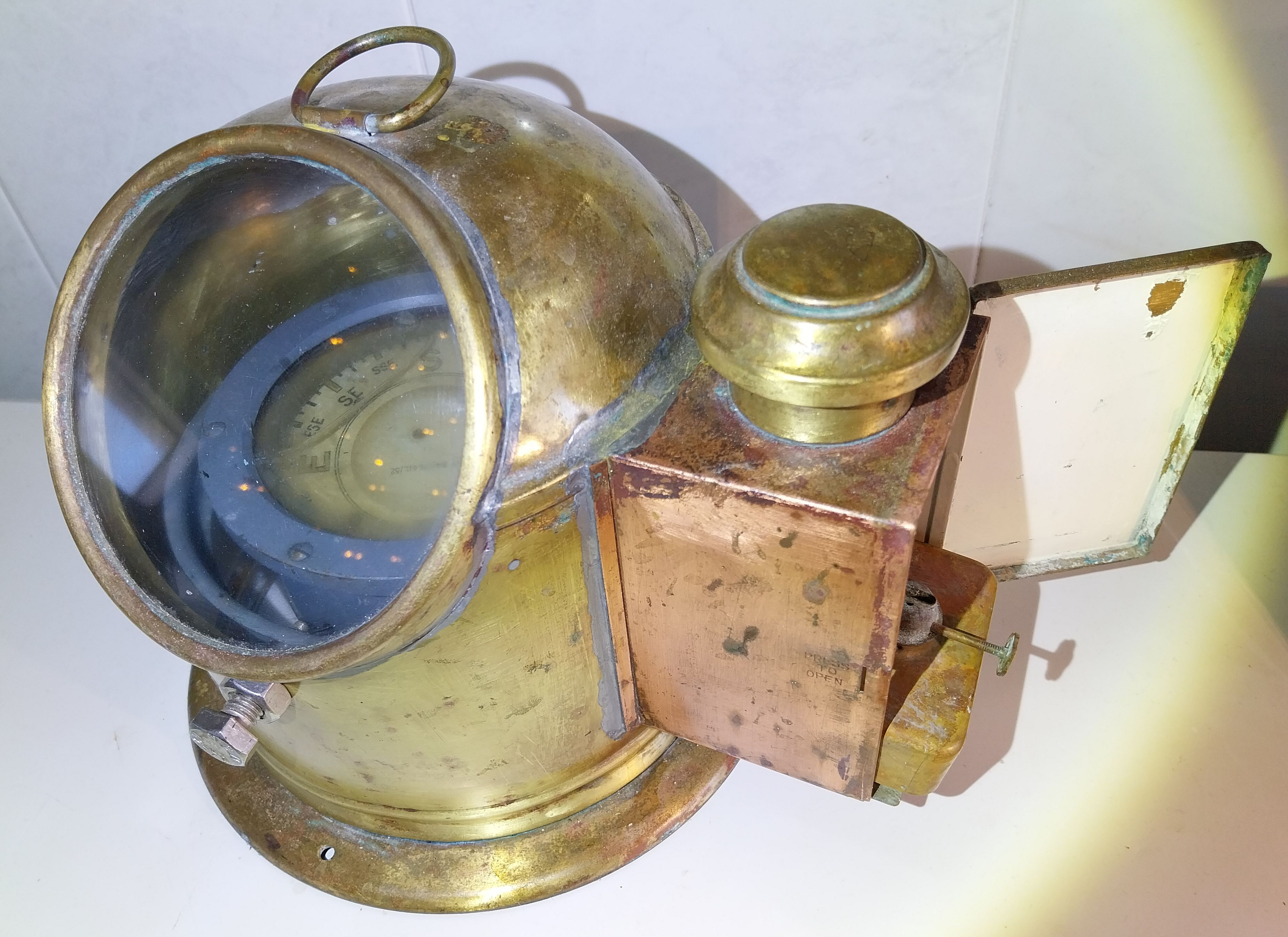
A Greek maritime liquid compass with an additional wick compartment for illumination.

The liquid compass is a design in which the magnetized needle or card is damped by fluid to protect against excessive swing or wobble, improving readability while reducing wear. A rudimentary working model of a liquid compass was introduced by Sir Edmond Halley at a meeting of the Royal Society in 1690. However, as early liquid compasses were fairly cumbersome and heavy and subject to damage, their main advantage was aboard the ship. Protected in a binnacle and normally gimbal-mounted, the liquid inside the compass housing effectively damped shock and vibration, while eliminating excessive swing and grounding of the card caused by the pitch and roll of the vessel. The first liquid mariner's compass believed practicable for limited use was patented by the Englishman Francis Crow in 1813. Liquid-damped marine compasses for ships and small boats were occasionally used by the Royal Navy from the 1830s through 1860, but the standard Admiralty compass remained a dry-mount type. In the latter year, the American physicist and inventor Edward Samuel Ritchie patented a greatly improved liquid marine compass that was adopted in revised form for general use by the United States Navy, and later purchased by the Royal Navy as well.

Despite these advances, the liquid compass was not introduced generally into the Royal Navy until 1908. An early version developed by RN Captain Creek proved to be operational under heavy gunfire and seas but was felt to lack navigational precision compared with the design by Lord Kelvin. However, with ship and gun sizes continuously increasing, the advantages of the liquid compass over the Kelvin compass became unavoidably apparent to the Admiralty, and after widespread adoption by other navies, the liquid compass was generally adopted by the Royal Navy.

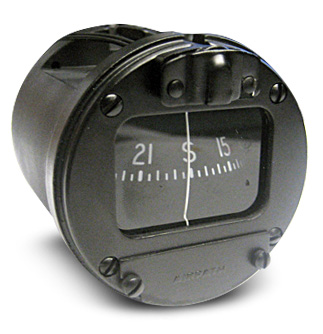
Typical aircraft-mounted magnetic compass

Liquid compasses were next adapted for aircraft. In 1909, Captain F.O. Creagh-Osborne, Superintendent of Compasses at the Admiralty, introduced his Creagh-Osborne aircraft compass, which used a mixture of alcohol and distilled water to damp the compass card. After the success of this invention, Capt. Creagh-Osborne adapted his design to a much smaller pocket model for individual use by officers of artillery or infantry, receiving a patent in 1915.

In December 1931, the newly founded Silva Company of Sweden introduced its first baseplate or bearing compass that used a liquid-filled capsule to damp the swing of the magnetized needle. The liquid-damped Silva took only four seconds for its needle to settle in comparison to thirty seconds for the original version.

In 1933 Tuomas Vohlonen, a surveyor by profession, applied for a patent for a unique method of filling and sealing a lightweight celluloid compass housing or capsule with a petroleum distillate to dampen the needle and protect it from shock and wear caused by excessive motion. Introduced in a wrist-mount model in 1936 as the Suunto Oy Model M-311, the new capsule design led directly to the lightweight liquid-filled field compasses of today.

== Gyrocompass ==
The first gyroscope for scientific use was made by the French physicist Léon Foucault (1819–1868) in 1852, who also named the device while researching in the same line that led him to use the eponymous pendulum, for which he was awarded a Copley Medal by the Royal Society. The gyrocompass was patented in 1885 by Marinus Gerardus van den Bos in The Netherlands after continuous spinning was made possible by small electric motors, which were, in turn, a technological outcome of the discovery of magnetic induction. Yet only in 1906 was the German inventor Hermann Anschütz-Kaempfe (1872–1931) able to build the first practical gyrocompass. It had two major advantages over magnetic compasses: it indicated true north and was unaffected by ferromagnetic materials, such as the steel hull of ships. Thus, it was widely used in the warships of World War I and modern aircraft.

== Non-navigational uses ==
=== Astronomy ===
Three compasses meant for establishing the meridian was described by Peter Peregrinus in 1269 (referring to experiments made before 1248) Late in the 13th century, al-Malik al-Ashraf of Yemen wrote a treatise on astrolabes, which included instructions and diagrams on using the compass to determine the meridian (khaṭṭ niṣf al-nahār) and Qibla. In 1300, a treatise written by the Egyptian astronomer and muezzin Ibn Simʿūn describes a dry compass for use as a "Qibla indicator" to find the direction to Mecca. Ibn Simʿūn's the compass, however, did not feature a compass card nor the familiar glass box. In the 14th century, the Syrian astronomer and timekeeper Ibn al-Shatir (1304–1375) invented a timekeeping device incorporating both a universal sundial and the magnetic compass. He invented it to find the times of salat prayers.

=== Building orientation ===
Evidence for the orientation of buildings by the means of a magnetic compass can be found in 12th-century Denmark: one fourth of its 570 Romanesque churches are rotated by 5–15 degrees clockwise from true east–west, thus corresponding to the predominant magnetic declination of the time of their construction. Most of these churches were built in the 12th century, indicating a fairly common usage of magnetic compasses in Europe by then.

=== Mining ===
The use of a compass as a direction finder underground was pioneered in the Tuscan mining town Massa where floating magnetic needles were employed for tunneling, and for defining the claims of the various mining companies, as early as the 13th century. In the second half of the 15th century, the compass became standard equipment for Tyrolian miners. Shortly afterward the first detailed treatise dealing with the underground use of compasses was published by a German miner Rülein von Calw (1463–1525).

=== Sun compass ===
A sun compass uses the position of the Sun in the sky to determine the directions of the cardinal points, making allowance for the local latitude and longitude, time of day, equation of time, and so on. At fairly high latitudes, an analog-display watch can be used as a very approximate sun compass. A simple sundial can be used as a much better one. An automatic sun compass developed by Lt. Col. James Allason, a mechanized cavalry officer, was adopted by the British Army in India in 1938 for use in tanks and other armored vehicles where the magnetic field was subject to distortion, affecting the standard-issue prismatic compass. Cloudy skies prohibited its use in European theatres. A copy of the manual is preserved in the Imperial War Museum in London.
