= Elbridge T. Gerry Mansion =

Demolished mansion in Manhattan, New York

Coordinates: 40.765547°N 73.971901°W

Elbridge Gerry Mansion
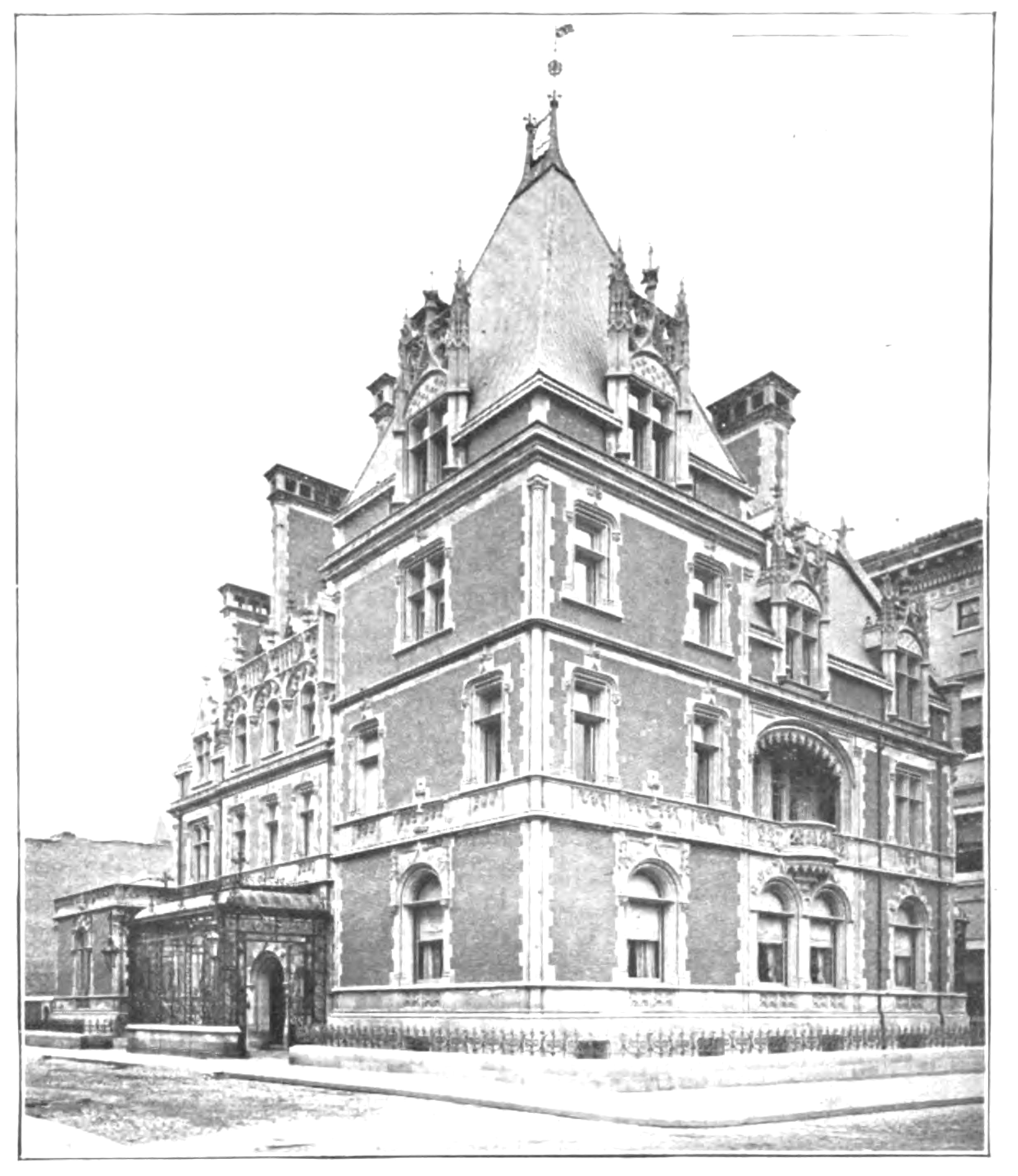
- The Elbridge Gerry Mansion in 1895, when newly built.

General information
- Architectural style: French Renaissance
- Location: Manhattan, New York City
- Completed: 1895
- Opened: 1897
- Demolished: 1929

Design and construction
- Architect: Richard Morris Hunt

The Elbridge T. Gerry Mansion was a lavish mansion built in 1895 and located at 2 East 61st Street, at the intersection of Fifth Avenue, on the Upper East Side of Manhattan, New York City. It was built for Commodore Elbridge Thomas Gerry, a grandson of statesman Elbridge Gerry.

== History ==
Elbridge Thomas Gerry (1837–1927) engaged architect Richard Morris Hunt to design an urban reinterpretation of a French Renaissance chateau, specifically requiring Hunt to provide space for his collection of 30,000 law books.

Plans for the house were formally announced in The New York Times on May 15, 1892. Construction began by 1895, and after a reported $3,000,000 in construction costs, the residence was opened officially in 1897. The entrance of the structure, via an iron porte-cochère, was based on the Louis XIII style wing of the Château de Blois.

The Gerry mansion became a center of cultivated and fashionable life, even as it came to be surrounded by skyscrapers. Gerry owned sculptural spandrel figures Night and Day by Isidore Konti. In his home, he displayed his extensive international art collection, which included such works as Jean-Léon Gérôme's "Plaza de Toros," a Jean-Jacques Henner bust portrait, Mihály Munkácsy's "Lac Chambre du Nourrisson" from 1884, Adolph Tidemand's "Sunday Morning in Norway," James Edward Freeman's "The Cave of Gasparoni" and "Study of a Young Girl," Jehan Georges Vibert's "The Cardinal's Nephew," Adolf Schreyer's "The Advance Guard," Achillo Guerra's "Absolution of Beatrice Cenci," Jean-Joseph Benjamin-Constant's "Venice: The Return of the Envoy," John Henry Dolph's "A Happy Family," Blackman's "Italian Kitchen," Edwin Lord Weeks' "Woodcarver's Shop: Delhi," Paul Jean Clays's "Port of Ostend," Mauritz de Haas' "Moonrise and Sunset," and Salvator Rosa's "The Revolt of the Tribe". He also owned works by Italian painter Camillo Gioja Barbera, Belgian painter Cornelius Van Leemputten, Polish painter Alfred Kowalski, Austro-French painter Rudolf Ernst, French painter Claude Joseph Vernet, Norwegian painter Vincent Stoltenberg Lerche, and Dutch painter Jan de Baen.

=== Demolition ===
Gerry's mansion survived for just 32 years. His executors sold the house after his death in 1927, and in 1929 it was demolished to make way for The Pierre hotel.

== See also ==
- Elbridge Gerry House, Marblehead, Massachusetts, birthplace of statesman Elbridge Gerry
