= Omegawave =

Sporting equipment manufacturer

- Founded: 1999; 27 years ago in Portland, Oregon, USA
- Founders: Leo Maskov; Val Nasedkin; Allen K. Huffstutter
- Headquarters: Espoo, Finland
- Services: Sports equipment manufacturing
- Website: www.omegawave.com

Omegawave Ltd. is a company that manufactures sports training equipment. It is based in Espoo, Finland. Omegawave was founded in 1999 and their products are based on the results of sports science research carried out by athletes and coaches from the former Soviet Union, and Soviet cosmonaut training technology.

In January 2013 they were listed by Talouselämä as one of Finland's most promising start-ups.

== History ==
The company began as OmegaWave Sport Inc. in Portland, Oregon, USA, being founded in 1999 by Leo Maskov, Val Nasedkin and Allen K. Huffstutter. The company was renamed Omegawave Ltd., and moved to Finland in 2012 after attracting investment from the Finnish innovation fund, Sitra, and Conor Venture Partners.

The key to Omegawave's system is the way the software, developed by Vladimir Larionov and Leonid Masakov, interprets electrocardiography (EKG), and a very slow moving♙Omega brain wave, and compares them with each other to determine an individual's current physical state.

With the move to Finland, Omegawave also attracted a number of former Nokia employees. Juha Pinomaa, who previously held a number of executive positions at Nokia and has also been President of Suunto, was advising the company in 2011, and served as the CEO in 2012–2014, followed by Gerard Bruen, another ex-Nokia executive. Chairman of the Board is Anssi Vanjoki, former vice CEO of Nokia and also Chairman of Amer Sports.

Two of the founders and original inventors of Omegawave's technology – Leo Masakov, Research Director, and Val Nasedkin, VP Business Development – also moved to Finland and continued working with the new company.

== History of the technology ==
The need for the product to be non-invasive and non-stressful came directly from the inventors’ experience in Soviet athletics teams and the testing methods they used. At that time Soviet athletes were tested to assess their condition once or twice a year, with the tests taking place in a hospital. The tests included highly stressful methods such as muscle biopsies and exercising till exhaustion. Since the results became available several weeks later, and the athletes took a long time to recover, they were of no practical use to the coaches. The technology and techniques that eventually became Omegawave products were therefore designed with the specific purpose of being quick, non-stressful and non-invasive, and to provide results that were easy for coaches to interpret. Published studies appear to indicate that these non-invasive methods are, as intended, as reliable as the more invasive methods.

== Notable users ==
Lionel Messi from FC Barcelona, Mario Balotelli from AC Milan, and Steven Gerrard from Liverpool F.C., are known to have used Omegawave products to reduce their risk of injury. The Russian National Triathlon team, the Seattle Sounders FC, and the Kentucky Wildcats are also known to use Omegawave products.
