= M311 =

M311 or M-311 may refer to:

- M-311 (Michigan highway)
- Alenia Aermacchi M-311, a turbofan-powered military trainer
- EML Wambola (M311), a Lindau-class minehunter of the Estonian Navy
- The CQ M-311, a variant of the Norinco CQ rifle
- The M-311 compass invented by Tuomas Vohlonen
