= Flavio Gioja =

Italian mariner and inventor

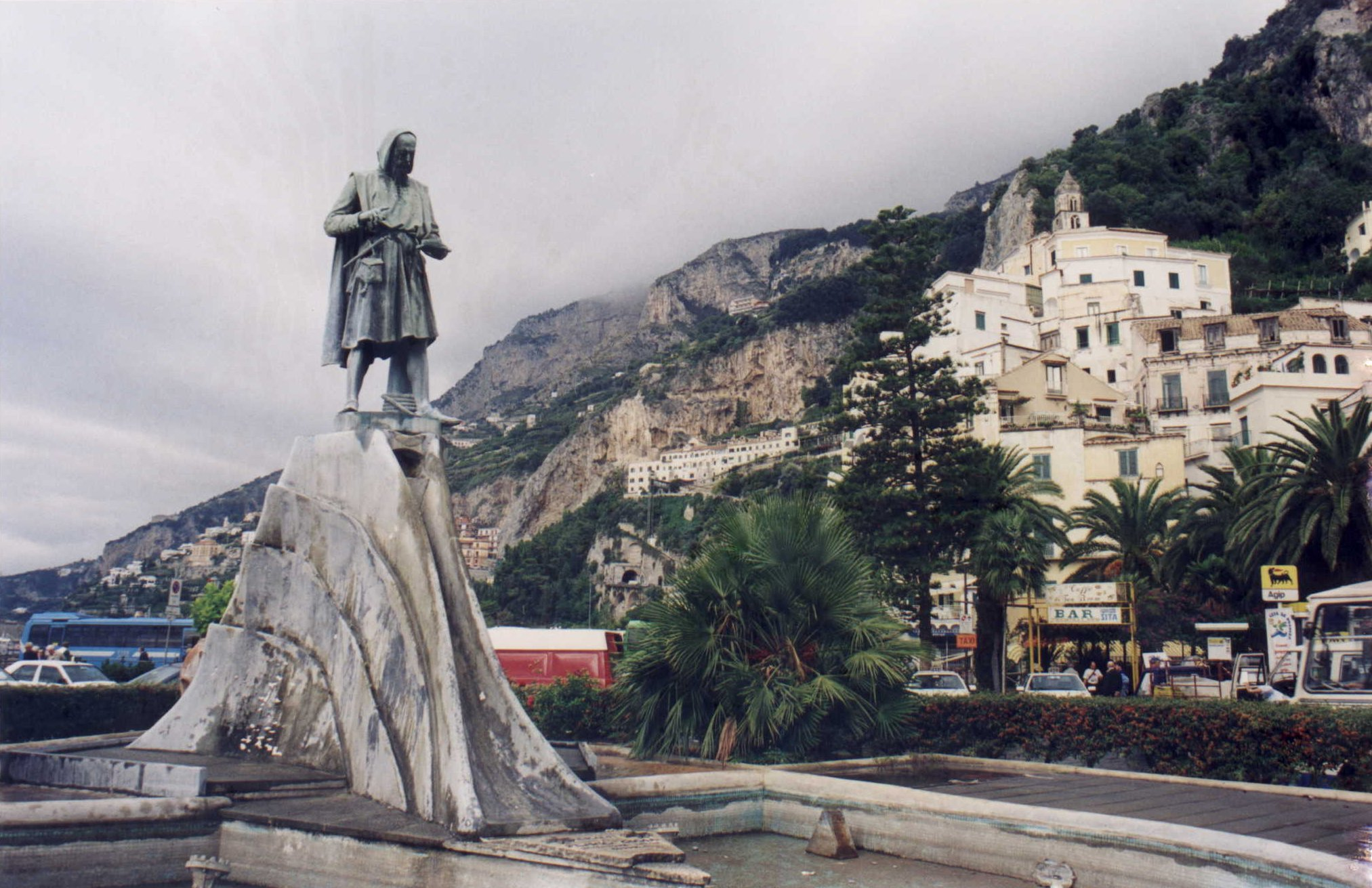
Statue of Flavio Gioia in Amalfi by Alfonso Balzico, 1900

Flavio Gioia or Gioja, also known as Ioannes Gira Amalphensis (Italian pronunciation: [ˈflaːvjo ˈdʒɔːja]; c. 1300 – ?) is reputed to have been an Italian mariner, inventor, and supposedly a marine pilot. He has traditionally been credited with developing the sailor's compass, but this has been debated. However, he is credited with perfecting it by suspending its needle over a wind rose design with north designed by a fleur-de-lys, and enclosing it in a box with a glass cover. He was also said to have introduced such design, which pointed North, to defend against Charles of Anjou, the French king of Naples.

Although the surname "Gioia" is true, the name "Flavio" has been demonstrated to be a translation error. His real name was probably Giovanni; and his birthplace has been found to be Positano, in the Amalfi Coast.

It is also likely that Flavio Gioja did not exist at all. In the middle of the XVth century historian Flavio Biondo wrote that compass had been invented in Amalfi. In 1511, Giovan Battista Pio wrote: "In Amalfi, Campania, the use of the magnet was invented, according to Flavio". But later due to a misplaced comma this was narrated as "the use of the magnet was invented by Flavio, it is said".

The lunar crater Gioja is named after him.

== See also ==
- History of the compass
- Amalfi
- Republic of Amalfi
