= James E. Freeman (painter) =

American painter

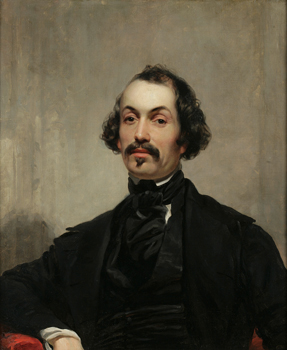
Portrait of James E. Freeman by Charles Loring Elliott

James Edward Freeman (1810 – November 21, 1884) was an American painter, diplomat, and author. He studied at the National Academy of Design in New York City and in Rome, Italy. He expatriated to Rome in 1841 when he was appointed U.S. Consul to Ancona, in the Papal States.

== Early life and career in America ==
Freeman was born on Indian Island, in New Brunswick, Canada, less than one mile distant from Eastport, Maine, where his parents lived. His father, Joshua Edwards Freeman, was a merchant and navigated the waters between the seaports frequently with his wife Eliza Morgan Freeman. In 1816 Freeman was sent to live with relatives in rural Otsego County, New York, but little information is known of his early life or his family circumstances.

In 1826 Freeman moved to New York City in order to study painting. There he encountered William Dunlap, a noted portraitist and history painter, whose works the young Freeman could have seen in upstate New York. Dunlap encouraged Freeman to enroll in the National Academy of Design in New York City, a nascent institution of which Dunlap was a founding member. Freeman joined the National Academy of Design's Antique School in its inaugural year, 1826, alongside two other notable American painters, William Sidney Mount and William Page. Freeman debuted at the National Academy of Design's Fourth Annual Exhibition in 1829 with Portrait of a Gentleman (unlocated). He was elected an Associate Member of the National Academy of Design on May 14, 1831, and elected to the prestigious position of Academician on May 1, 1833.

By 1831 Freeman began to paint fancy pictures, typically life-sized, single-figure (occasionally multi-figure) paintings which were similar in appearance to portraits but possessed a greater expressiveness and which frequently depicted hired models rather than paying sitters. Many of Freeman's associates, including Samuel F. B. Morse, Charles Cromwell Ingham, Henry Inman, Mount, and Page, were also painting fancy pictures, as was Washington Allston, who began painting them in the first decade of the century. Freeman would also have been familiar with 18th-century European fancy pictures by Joshua Reynolds, Jean-Baptiste Greuze, and Thomas Gainsborough, as well as the 17th-century secular works by Bartolomé Esteban Murillo that inspired the genre. Like many aspiring American painters of the era, however, Freeman continued to rely upon bespoke portraiture for his livelihood and became semi-itinerant in the 1830s, seeking and fulfilling commissions in Cooperstown, New York, Litchfield, Connecticut, New Orleans, Louisiana, and Utica, New York, from his home base in New York City and, later, Albany, New York.

Financed by his enlightened patron base in Albany, led by John Adams Dix, Freeman embarked for England in September 1836. He carried letters of introduction from Morse to the esteemed Anglo-American painter Charles Robert Leslie in London and the eminent Danish neoclassical sculptor Bertel Thorvaldsen in Rome. Traveling through England, to Paris, Marseilles, and then to the Italian port of Leghorn, Freeman arrived in Rome on November 30, 1836, and took quarters at Via Laurina 97. There were only two other American artists concurrently residing at Rome, the neoclassical sculptor Thomas Crawford and the painter Frederick William Philip. Freeman and Crawford were allowed to attend the life school of the so-called English Academy, which convened nightly to work from nude models in the deconsecrated church of San Giovanni della Ficozza at Via dei Maroniti 29. Their British peers there included Morris Moore, Patrick Allan-Fraser, Edward Matthew Ward, and the brothers Robert Scott Lauder and James Eckford Lauder.

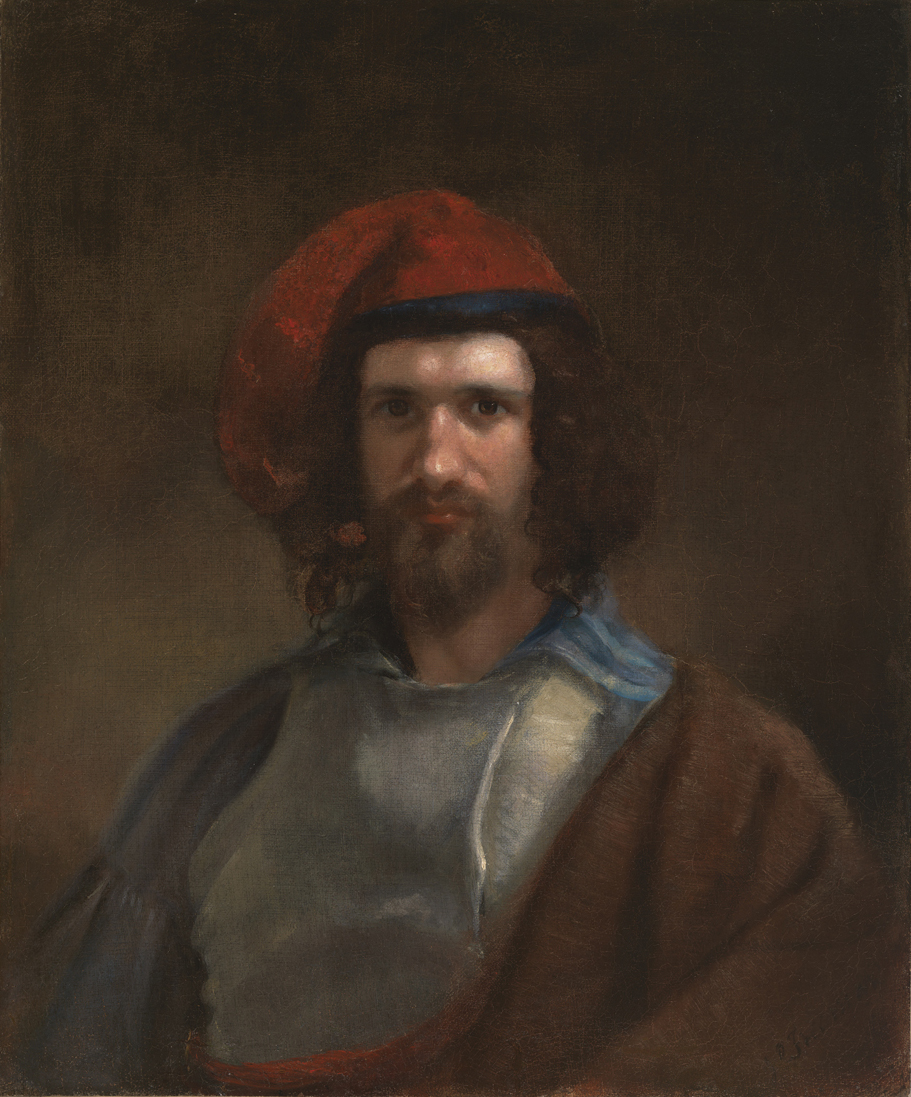
James E. Freeman, Masaniello, 1837, oil on canvas, 29 1/2 x 24 5/8 in. (74.9 x 62.5 cm). Private collection

During his brief nine-month residence in Rome, Freeman painted Masaniello (private collection), a fancy picture of the Italian folk hero Tommaso Aniello, known as Masaniello, who led a successful uprising against Spanish rule of Naples in 1647 and became a potent symbol of Italian unification. Freeman's choice of subject matter reveals his own early support for the cause of the Italian Risorgimento.Freeman departed Rome in September 1837 and is recorded back in Albany, New York that December.

== Consulship and political activities ==
Freeman's return to the United States proved disappointing, as he received neither the financial support nor critical approbation that he had anticipated. Assisted by his Albany political connections, namely Dix, Horatio Seymour, Thurlow Weed, and William H. Seward, he lobbied the administration of Martin Van Buren for a consulship to enable him to settle permanently in Italy. In April 1840 he was officially named the first U.S. Consul to Ancona, part of the Papal States. He sailed from New York City in January 1841, received his exequatur in Rome that spring, and visited Ancona that July. His position was essentially a sinecure, however, and Freeman soon designated a local man to serve as his vice-consul and returned to Rome to pursue his art. He never went to Ancona again.

On May 14, 1848, Freeman married Horatia Augusta Latilla, an Anglo-Italian sculptor in Florence. They lived together at Via Capo le Case 68 in Rome, which also contained their studios. Shortly thereafter a series of revolts spread throughout the peninsula in the wake of the Italian Risorgimento. Rome became embroiled after the assassination of Pope Pius IX's prime minister, Pellegrino Rossi, on November 15, 1848. On November 24, 1848, the pope fled Rome refusing to come back; therefore, the Romans between December and January organized and held ballots to elect a Constitutional Assembly which in February 1849 proclaimed the Roman Republic; the volatile situation proved overwhelming to the U.S. Consul to Rome, Nicholas Brown III, and he enlisted Freeman's assistance, since he still held the title of U.S. Consul to Ancona but was staying in Rome.

When French troops invaded Rome in June 1849 in order to restore the pope's temporal authority over the city, most foreigners fled the violence and turmoil, but Freeman remained. His firsthand chronicle of the siege was published in the New York Evening Post that August. Within days after the French breached the city walls and on July 3, 1849, they occupied Rome. Consul Brown - who had come into conflict with the French for hiding wanted Italian patriots in his home - claimed to be ill and hastily departed his post, appointing Freeman acting Roman consul in his absence. Freeman embraced the opportunity to assist those who had fomented and abetted the revolution. He personally erected the American flag on Margaret Fuller's balcony on Locanda Dies in via Gregoriana, fearing that her pro-Italian, anti-French dispatches to the New York Tribune could have placed her in danger. He hid the apostate Italian priest Alessandro Gavazzi in his home for three nights and helped him escape to England. Most significantly, Freeman contrived a form of improvised passport for thousands of Italians who faced death if captured by the French or Austrians, ensuring their safe passage out of Italy and, ostensibly, to America. These actions were presumably done by Freeman out of personal conviction and with the expectation that his diplomatic post would immunize him from prosecution; however, his consulship to Ancona was suddenly revoked and given to the sculptor Joseph Mozier and a new consul replaced Brown at Rome. The American Chargé d'Affaires Lewis Cass Jr. later attached Freeman to his legation, thereby guaranteeing he could stay on at Rome as an artist after the pope was reinstalled.

== Artistic career in Italy ==
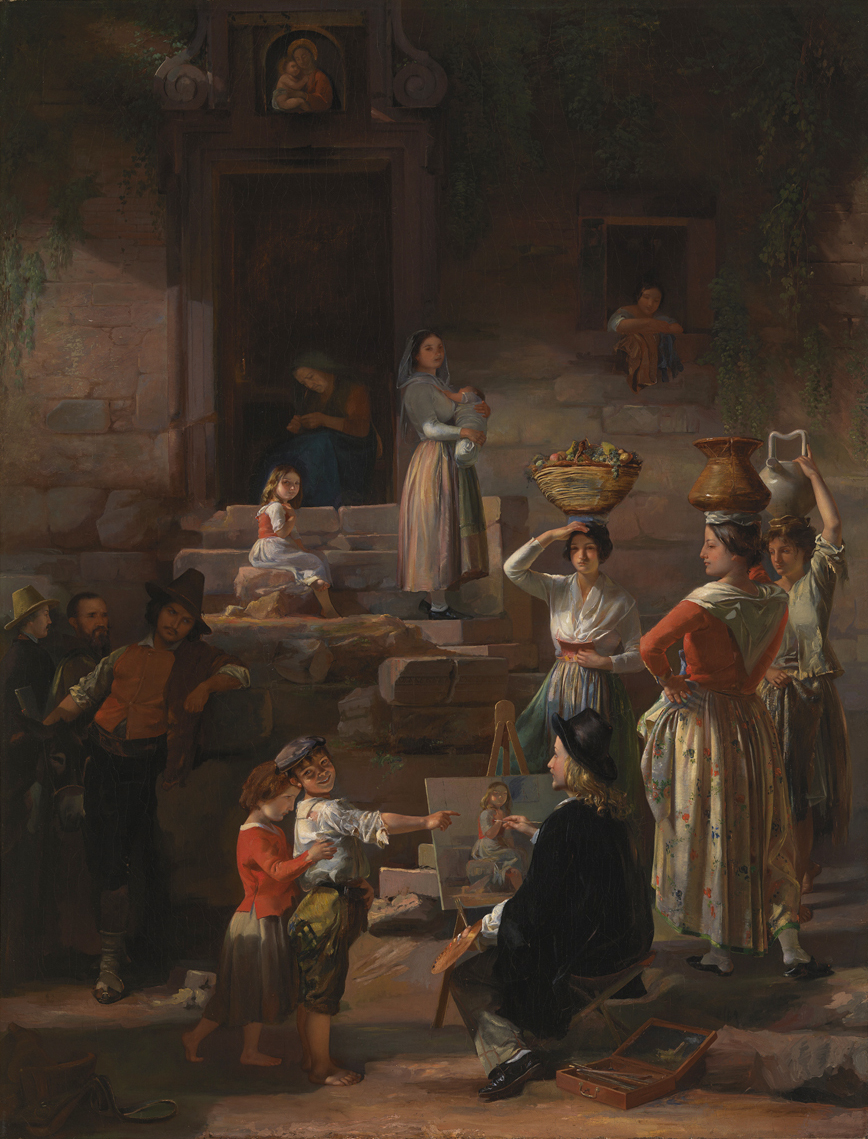
James E. Freeman, Costume Picture, 1857, oil on canvas, 59 1/4 x 45 1/2 in. (150.3 x 115.5 cm). Private collection

For more than forty years, Freeman remained a prominent fixture of the vibrant art scene in Rome, painting fancy pictures of humble Italian contadini, impish street urchins, Madonna-like rustic beauties, and blind mendicants for an international clientele. These sentimental character studies were appealing for their artless beauty, an ideal closely allied to the 18th-century cult of sensibility, which advocated that strong emotional responses to visual and literary stimuli could help foster compassion and ethical behavior. Freeman's dedication to the communicative potential of the fancy picture resulted in a cohesive portfolio that constitutes his impact to American art. In many of his works Freeman expressed his ardent support for nationhood and religious freedom in Italy, as well as abolition and tolerance in the United States. In his painting The Savoyard Boy in London (1865, Smithsonian American Art Museum). Freeman makes parallels between Italy's internal struggle for unification with the American Civil War.

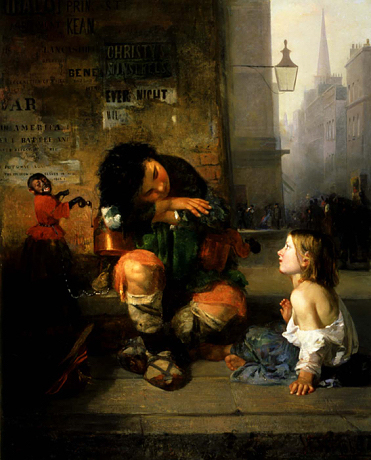
James E. Freeman, The Savoyard Boy in London, 1865, oil on canvas, 54 1/2 x 43 3/4 in. (138.4 x 111.2 cm). Smithsonian American Art Museum

Artistically, Freeman reached the pinnacle of his career by mid-century. American tourists, however, were slow to return to Rome after the political tumult that defined the late 1840s, so he began to cultivate a new base of European⎯primarily English⎯clients, who already recognized and esteemed the idiom of the fancy picture in which he specialized. Freeman's fortunes continued to decline in the 1860s as aesthetic tastes changed and his physical abilities⎯his eyesight most notably⎯declined with age. He increasingly devoted his energies to literary pursuits, beginning with Photographs from Recent Pictures by J. E. Freeman, N.A. (1870), in which he coupled photographs after his paintings with prose and poetry, and culminating with two volumes of memoirs.

== Memoirs ==
In 1877 Freeman published the first volume of his memoirs, entitled Gatherings from an Artist’s Portfolio, followed in 1883 with Gatherings from an Artist’s Portfolio in Rome. The collection of anecdotes and stories that fill the two volumes of Gatherings is similar to the miscellaneous scenes that fill an artist's sketchbooks. Freeman alternated chapters on some of the eminent people he knew in Rome, such as John Gibson, William Makepeace Thackeray, Crawford, and the Italian Princess Borghese (née Guindalina Talbot) with others devoted to the contadini who populated his fancy pictures, such as Giovannina of Saracinesca, the young boy Angelo, and “La Nonna," who he called "my venerable model.” The memoirs proved popular with both the public and the critics, and they were likened to Nathaniel Hawthorne’s The Marble Faun and Our Old Home, as well as to William Wetmore Story’s Roba di Roma. Today Freeman's Gatherings continue to be consulted by scholars for their unique insight and historical information about the international art scene at Rome in the 19th century.
