= Gioja (crater) =

Crater on the Moon

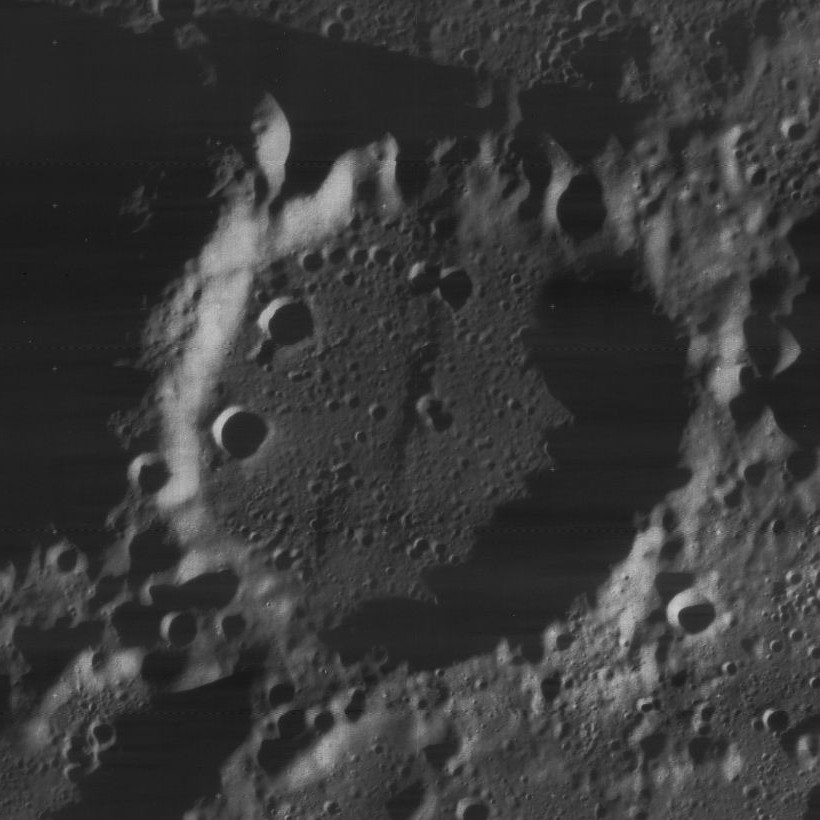
- Lunar Orbiter 4 image
- Coordinates: 83.3°N 2.0°E
- Diameter: 41 km
- Depth: 1.20 km (0.75 mi)
- Colongitude: 4° at sunrise
- Eponym: Flavio Gioia

Gioia is a lunar impact crater that is located in the vicinity of the north pole of the Moon. It is named after the alleged Italian inventor of the compass, Flavio Gioia. As it lies so close to the northern limb, it is viewed nearly from the edge making difficult to observe from the Earth. The crater is attached to the southern rim of the larger Byrd, a formation with low walls. To the south-southeast is the crater Main.

The rim of Gioia remains nearly circular, but is worn and somewhat eroded. The exterior ramparts have been modified by subsequent impacts, particularly along the western rim. The rim achieves its high point to the northwest, where it has been reinforced by the rim of the crater Byrd and other since-vanished formations. The interior floor is nearly flat, with a low cleft or ridge running from the midpoint to the north-northeast rim. Several tiny craterlets mark the inner floor, most notably a pair near the west-northwestern inner wall.
