= Zhu Yu (author) =

Chinese maritime historian

Zhu Yu (Chinese: 朱彧; Wade–Giles: Chu Yü) was a Chinese maritime historian during the Song dynasty (960–1279 AD). He retired in Huang Gang (黄岗) of the Hubei province, bought a country house and named it "Pingzhou". He called himself the "expert gardener of Pingzhou" (萍洲老圃). Between 1111 and 1117 AD, Zhu Yu wrote the book Pingzhou Ketan (萍洲可談; Pingzhou Table Talks), published in 1119 AD. It covered a wide variety of maritime subjects and issues in China at the time. His extensive knowledge of maritime engagements, technologies, and practices were because his father, Zhu Fu, was the Port Superintendent of Merchant Shipping for Guangzhou from 1094 until 1099 AD, whereupon he was elevated to the status of governor there and served in that office until 1102 AD.

== Pingzhou Table Talks ==
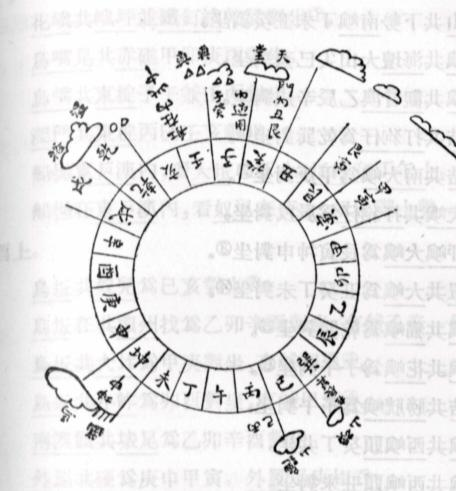
Diagram of a Ming dynasty mariner's compass

In terms of global significance, Zhu Yu's book was the first book in history to mention the use of the mariner's magnetic-needle compass for navigation at sea. Although the compass needle was first described in detail by the Chinese scientist Shen Kuo (1031–1095) in his Dream Pool Essays of 1088 AD, he did not specifically outline its use for navigation at sea. The passage from Zhu Yu's Pingzhou Ketan relating to the use of the compass states:

According to government regulations concerning seagoing ships, the larger ones can carry several hundred men, and the smaller ones may have more than a hundred men on board. One of the most important merchants is chosen to be Leader (Gang Shou), another is Deputy Leader (Fu Gang Shou), and a third is Business Manager (Za Shi). The Superintendent of Merchant Shipping gives them an unofficially sealed red certificate permitting them to use the light bamboo for punishing their company when necessary. Should anyone die at sea, his property becomes forfeit to the government...The ship's pilots are acquainted with the configuration of the coasts; at night they steer by the stars, and in the day-time by the sun. In dark weather they look at the south-pointing needle (i.e. the magnetic compass). They also use a line a hundred feet long with a hook at the end which they let down to take samples of mud from the sea-bottom; by its (appearance and) smell they can determine their whereabouts.

Although Zhu began writing his book in 1111 AD, it referred to events concerning various seaports of China from the year 1086 onwards. Therefore, it is plausible that at the time that Shen Kuo began writing his book, the compass needle was being used for navigation.

Beyond the compass, Zhu's book described many other maritime subjects. Zhu Yu's book described the use of the for-and-aft lug, taut mat sails, and the practice of beating-to-windward. Zhu also described bulkhead builds in the hulls of Chinese ships for creating watertight compartments. Therefore, if a ship's hull was heavily damaged, only one compartment would fill with water while the ship could be salvaged without sinking. Zhu Yu wrote that ships springing a leak could hardly be repaired from the inside, though; instead the Chinese employed expert foreign divers (people from the "Kunlun Mountains" region) that would dive into the water with chisels and oakum and mend the damage from the outside. Expert divers were written of by many Chinese authors, including Song Yingxing (1587–1666) who wrote about pearl divers that used watertight leather face masks attached with breathing tubes secured with tin rings that led up to the surface, allowing them to breathe underwater for long periods of time. Since at least the Tang dynasty (618–907 AD), the Chinese also had a formula for a waterproof cream applied to silk clothes that proved useful for divers.

Confirming Zhu Yu's writing on Song dynasty ships with bulkhead hull compartments, in 1973 a 24 m (78 ft) long, 9 m (29 ft) wide Song dynasty trade ship from circa 1277 AD was dredged from the water off the southern coast of China; this ship contained 12 bulkhead compartment rooms within its hull.

== Zhu Yu’s account of boat guiding methods ==
Various sources, including books and sea route orientation charts, indicate that ancient Chinese navigation utilized three distinct steering methods: near shore terrestrially geographical guiding navigation, offshore astronomical navigation, and magnetic compass navigation. These methods had all been roughly refined and developed simultaneously during the Song and Yuan dynasties through navigation practice.

The earliest Chinese compasses were probably not originally invented for navigation, but to harmonize environments and buildings in accordance with the geometric principles of Feng Shui. It is proved that the earliest Chinese reference recording a magnetic device used as a "direction finder" is in a Song dynasty book dated from 960 to 1279. The earliest record about the actual use of a magnetized needle for navigation is Zhu Yu's book Pingzhou Table Talks, written in 1102. The invention of compass greatly improved the safety and efficiency of travel, especially oceanic navigation.

China's first permanent navy was established in 1132 during the Song dynasty (960-1279 AD), following numerous naval battles that occurred beforehand. Additionally, gunpowder warfare was first utilized at sea in China, as seen in battles like the Battle of Caishi and the Battle of Tangdao on the Yangtze River in 1161 AD. Zhu Yu's Pingzhou Table Talks of 1119 AD was a crucial piece of medieval maritime literature, as it was the first book to outline the use of the magnetic-needle compass for navigation at sea. The book also described the use of watertight bulkhead compartments in Chinese ship hulls, which prevented sinking when heavily damaged in one compartment. While the drydock was known at this time, expert divers were still employed to repair boats that were damaged and submerged in water. Divers continued to hold maritime significance in China, as the later Ming dynasty author Song Yingxing (1587–1666) wrote about pearl divers using snorkeling gear to breathe underwater while tied to the ship to hunt for pearls.

== See also ==
- Chinese literature
- History of the Song dynasty
- Technology of the Song dynasty
- Wujing Zongyao
- South-pointing chariot
- Alexander Neckam
