= Tuomas Vohlonen =

Finnish inventor (1877–1939)

- Born: 24 September 1877; Orimattila, Grand Duchy of Finland, Russian Empire
- Died: 27 March 1939 (aged 61); Helsinki, Finland
- Resting place: Ruokolahti, Finland
- Other name: Tommo
- Occupation: inventor
- Known for: Founder of Suunto
- Spouse: Maria Elisa (Elli) Vohlonen

Tuomas "Tommo" Vohlonen (24 September 1877 – 27 March 1939) was a Finnish inventor. A surveyor by trade, his patents cover a wide area of devices and activities including compasses, skis, surveying, engines and farming. He founded the company Suunto Oy which is still active producing compasses according to his patented method as well as dive computers, sport watches and heart-rate monitors.

In April 1933, after experimentation with various designs, Vohlonen applied for a patent from the Finnish Patent and Registration Office for a compact liquid-filled field compass, in which the magnetic needle and damping fluid were completely sealed into a unitary fused celluloid capsule. Vohlonen was granted a patent on 25 January 1935. Together with his wife Elli and nephew Kauko he founded Suunto Oy in 1936. Vohlonen incorporated his new liquid-filled capsule into a lightweight wrist-mounted design, the Suunto M-311, suitable for use by soldiers, surveyors, hikers, and others navigating while afoot.

== Early life ==
In September 1877, Juho and Helena Vohlonen had a son in Vohloja ranch, Orimattila. Later they had four more children, sons Kelpo Hyvä (surveyor, wrestler) and Oiva Lahja (officer) and daughters Sievä Maria a.k.a. Maija (agronomist, sheep specialist, author) and Oma Eeva (agronomist), but this son was nominated Tuomas, with only one first name. Parents called him Tommo, and that nomination was used through his life. Only a few years before his death Tuomas could be seen in official patent papers. During the siblings' childhood the family moved to Lappeenranta for a short while, then to Kekäleenmäki, Ruokolahti. There Juho Vohlonen worked as smith and also did some farming. Helena and Juho Vohlonen weren't highly educated, but they had decided their children will get the highest education possible. Including daughters, which wasn't very typical of that time. Earlier stages of school were done in Ruokolahti, later stages in Lappeenranta. Tuomas went to college in Finnish Viipuri, nowadays Russified Vyborg. After that, Tuomas studied in Finnish polytechnic to become a surveyor.

== Interests and influences ==
Vohlonen siblings were all interested in outdoor living, sports, hunting and fishing. Tuomas’ brother Kelpo Vohlonen was a competition-level wrestler trained by an Olympic winner Verner Weckman, but it's told Tuomas still defeated him easily in wrestling. Tuomas was attracted by wilderness, distant districts, snow fields and open waters. Even when he had settled in Helsinki, he travelled to Saimaa as often as possible. There he had a small boat with outboard motor and a sauna on a beach he had entirely bought. Orienteering was one of Tuomas' favorites, and eventually it became the work of his life.

== As inventor ==
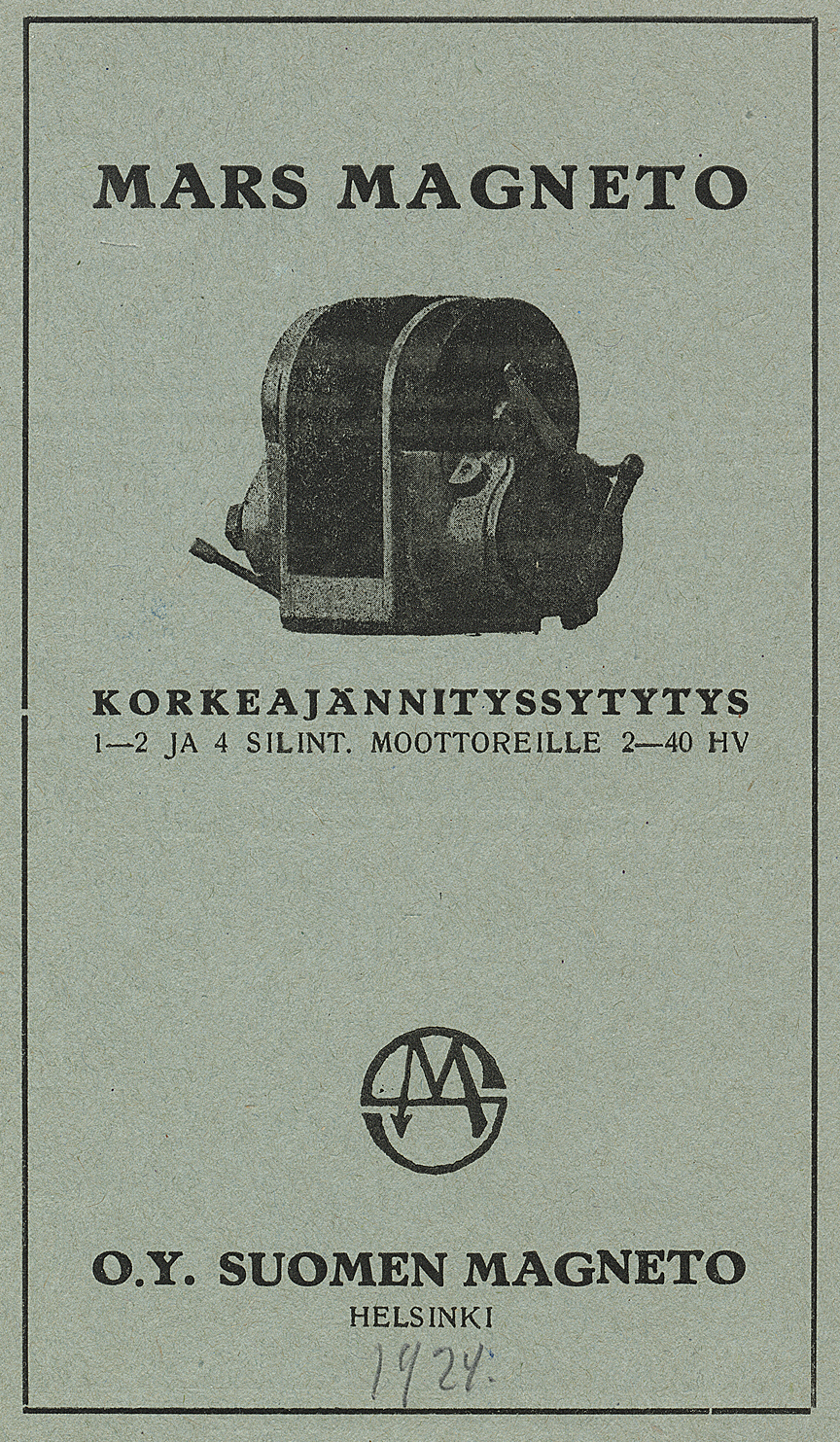
Advertisement of Mars Magneto from 1924

Oldest of Vohlonen's innovations was to turn the compass needle into vertical position. Through this, the needle stabilized more quickly. After many decades Vohlonen returned developing the compass and invented a method of fabricating the needle chamber. With this method the needle chamber could be sealed hermetically and the chamber had a waved bottom plate to stabilize the pressure. He also improved many nautical and airplane compasses. During the same time, he developed a device for measuring height, for example of trees. He also developed a holder for compass. It was named PIVO, an abbreviation of names Pihkala and Vohlonen. His ski bindings has been playing a role in development of Finnish skiing. In the 1930s, living in Helsinki, he started developing the bindings. Because of new version of binding, also the ski boots had to be redeveloped. Spark devices of combustion engines were of his interest in the 1920s. He built them in Pori. He had a small factory for them, and he went on with them later in Helsinki, having them produced under brand Mars. Because of his innovation, the frame of magneto could be manufactured from a single piece. He also invented a starting assistant for magneto, which gave out a full spark even with slow revolutions. In farming he developed a classifier for grain, and for forestry he developed a plow, both later fabricated by Rosenlew. In surveying, in addition to the tree height measuring device, he developed a device for angular measuring and also other assistive gear. He developed a method for fast reading and learning. Engineer Tuomas Vohlonen died on 27 March 1939, at age of 61. He is buried in Ruokolahti, Finland.

== Lawsuits about patents ==
=== The original patent ===
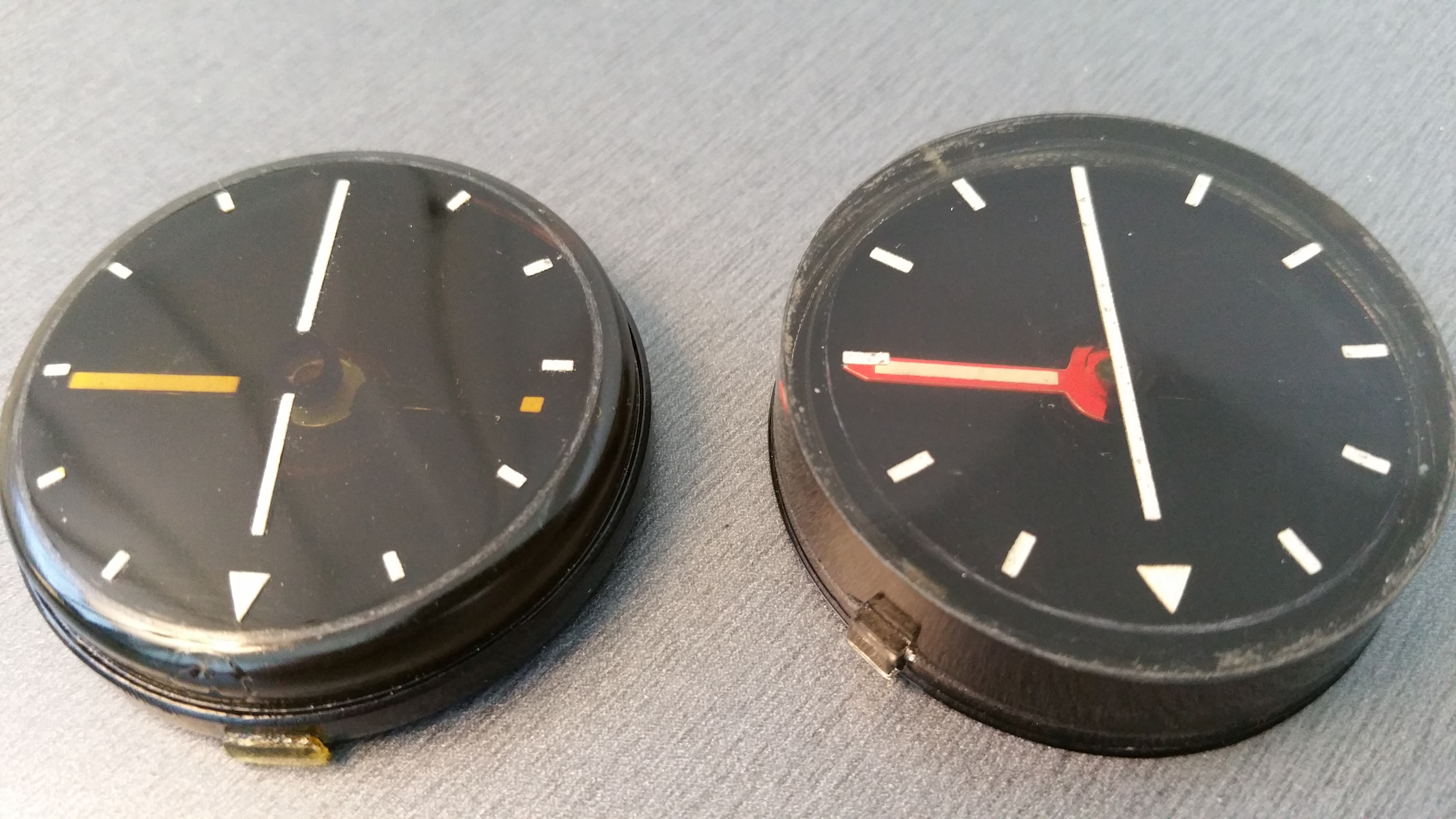
The original needle chamber of Suunto M-311 on the left with filling hole visible. On the right: newer design.

On 10 April 1933, Tuomas Vohlonen applied for a patent for a liquid compass, with the description "liquid compass with compass needle and liquid entirely sealed in a container made of celluloid". On 3 September 1934, Vohlonen supplemented the application with edited patent demands: 1: Method of manufacturing a liquid compass, in which the liquid chamber is manufactured of two or more pieces and jointed by gluing or soldering, to form a sealed chamber, 2: Liquid is pressed into chamber through a small hole, which is then sealed with glue or soldering and 3: Liquid compass built under conditions 1 and 2, and 4: the needle chamber is made entirely of celluloid or other substance like it. Now the application included the fabrication method. On 11 September 1934, Vohlonen made another supplement, which included the same as the previous, only rephrased. On 25 January 1935, Vohlonen was granted a patent number 16285 for a method of manufacturing a liquid compass and a liquid compass manufactured accordingly. The patent was effective from the date of first application, 10 April 1933.

In November 1932, a Swedish company Nya Instrumentfabriks Aktiebolaget Lyth had applied for a patent also in Finland for "vätskekompass", a liquid filled compass. In the application the needle chamber was described as being built of two different materials, of which only the upper part was made of flexible material. Nothing was mentioned about method of fabrication. This caused a threat and delay for accepting Vohlonen's patent. However, these applications were not considered to be about the same kind of product, so both Vohlonen and Lyth were granted a patent. This is one of the reasons why Vohlonen had to supplement his application: he knew the original formulation wouldn't succeed.

Oy Physica AB, a Finnish company, had made compasses under license by Vohlonen, and these resembled heavily the original Suunto M-311, only minor changes were made. The license expired in 1935. In a publication by Metos Oy about their company history, it is said: In the same premises as Metos Oy, a sister company administrated by same owners, Oy Physica Ab was a supplier for Finnish military forces. It employed about 20 people. The most significant article for Physica was a compass, competing the market with Suunto Oy. Physica sued Vohlonen, because, according to them, the supplements described a totally different product, the original application didn’t mention anything about a manufacturing method and, in addition, the method was elsewhere used long before the patent application, thus, the patent should be cancelled. On 27 September 1940 the first stage of court gave a statement: It is not up to them to judge whether the patent was given according to faulty descriptions, thus the patent remains effective as it was. On 27 March 1942, the second stage of court gave a statement, according to which all the structures described in the patent were known before, and thus the patent shouldn’t have been granted, and declared the patent void. On 9 September 1943, the supreme court abolished the second stage judgement, ratified the first stage judgement and thus, the patent remained effective.

=== On bezel ===
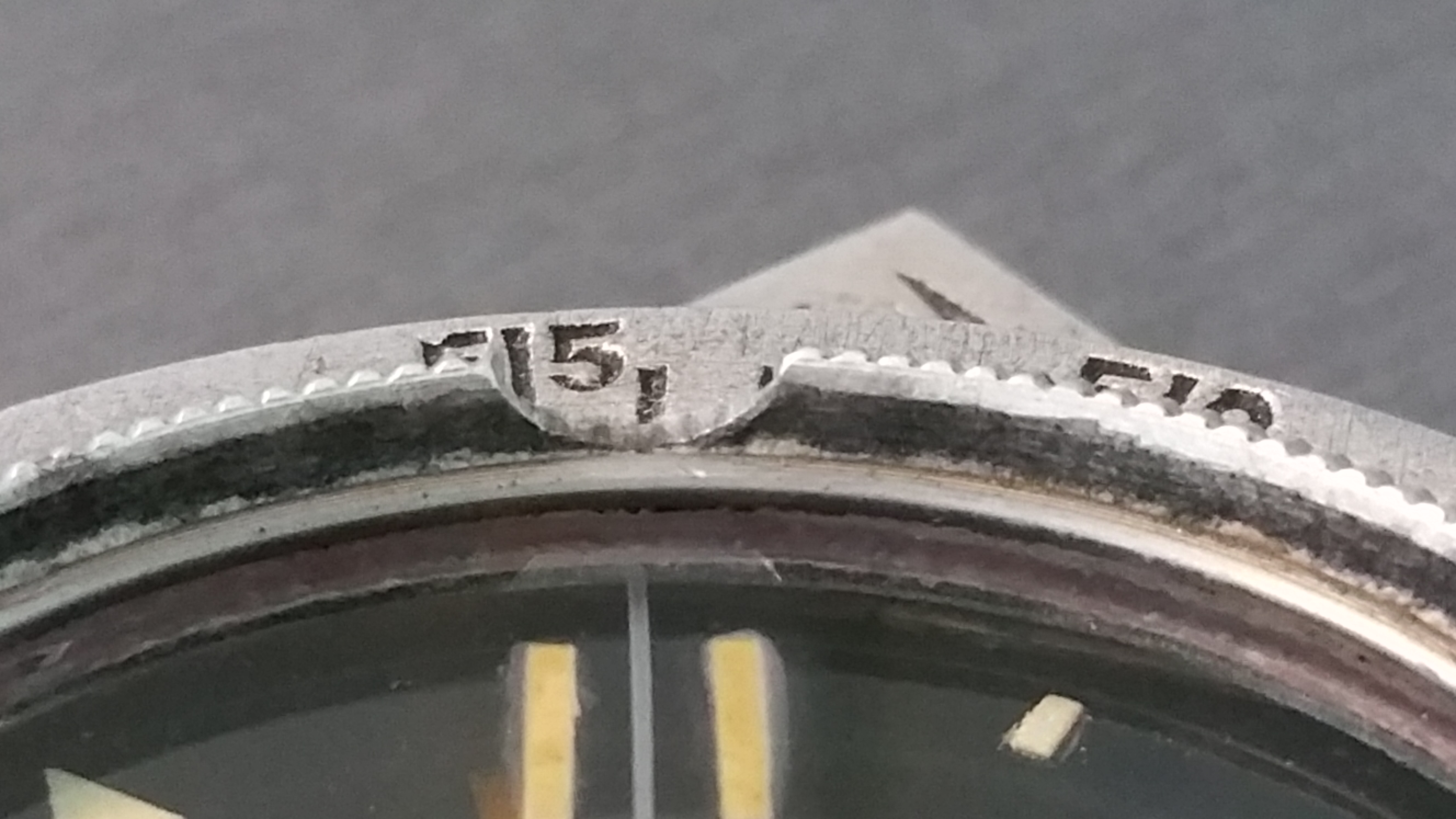
The patented groove on the bezel of Suunto M-311

Tuomas Vohlonen was granted a patent number 16121 on 12 October 1934. It was for a device in a compass to measure the angle. It was described as being in a bezel, in which there were diagonal grooves, screws or other alike to place a ruler, pen or alike, to rotate a bezel to align with the north of map. On a first trial, Physica sued Vohlonen on a basis that the device already existed and was well known before the date of patent application. On the second trial of the same question, Physica sued Vohlonen, because they didn’t consider the device to be any followance of creative work to be considered an innovation, let alone to be worth patenting. Also, they considered the patent to disturb their business and thus, they demanded the patent to be void. On the first trial, the supreme court judged the patent to be effective. On the second trial, Vohlonen family didn't even respond, saying the matter was already solved in the first trial. The supreme court gave its final statement on 25 February 1944, according to which the court didn’t change the verdict of the first trial.

=== Confiscating the tools ===
On 18 November 1935, because of the demand of Tuomas Vohlonen, the court gave an order to confiscate the tools of Physica, which were used for making compasses. The confiscation was executed three days later. Physica sued Vohlonen family, the lawsuit went through all the stages of the court, and the supreme court gave its statement on 17 February 1947, according to which the tools could have been used for other purposes also, so the confiscation wasn't necessary. Vohlonen family had to pay Physica for the damage caused.

=== The result ===
Cases mentioned above provide a preview of the setting. Suunto Oy and Vohlonen family won most of these long-lasting trials and the patents remained effective. Soon after these times, Physica gradually quit the manufacture of compasses as unprofitable and the whole company vanished.
