= Suunto =

Finnish manufacturer of compasses, dive computers and sports watches

Coordinates: 60°16′19″N 24°58′22″E

Suunto Oy

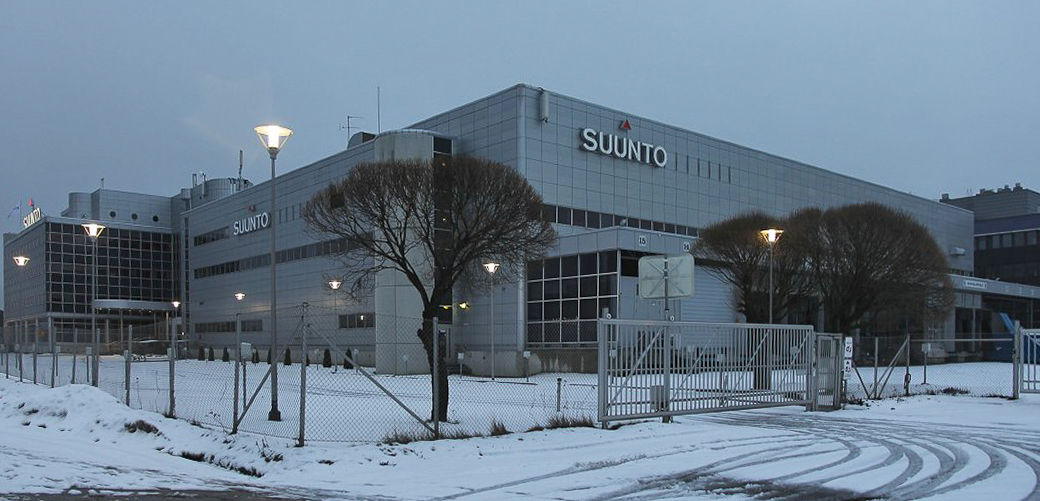
- Suunto's headquarters and production facilities in Vantaa, Finland
- Type: Subsidiary
- Industry: Measuring instruments
- Founded: 1936; 90 years ago
- Founder: Tuomas Vohlonen
- Headquarters: Vantaa, Finland
- Area served: Worldwide
- Products: Outdoor, performance and lifestyle watches ⋅ Diving computers ⋅ Compasses ⋅ Precision instruments
- Owner: Liesheng
- Number of employees: 300+
- Parent: Liesheng
- Website: suunto.com

Suunto Oy is a Finnish company that manufactures and markets sports watches, dive computers, compasses and precision instruments. Headquartered in Vantaa, Finland, Suunto employs more than 300 people worldwide, and its products are sold in over 100 countries. Although globally active, the headquarters is placed next to the factory in which most of the work stages are still handcrafted. Suunto was a subsidiary of Amer Sports, owned since 2019 by the Chinese group Anta Sports, with sister brands Wilson, Atomic, Sports Tracker, Salomon, Precor, and Arc'teryx. In May 2022, Chinese technology company Liesheng acquired Suunto from Amer Sports.

The company's name comes from the Finnish word suunta, meaning "direction" or "path", or in navigation, "bearing" or "heading".

== History ==
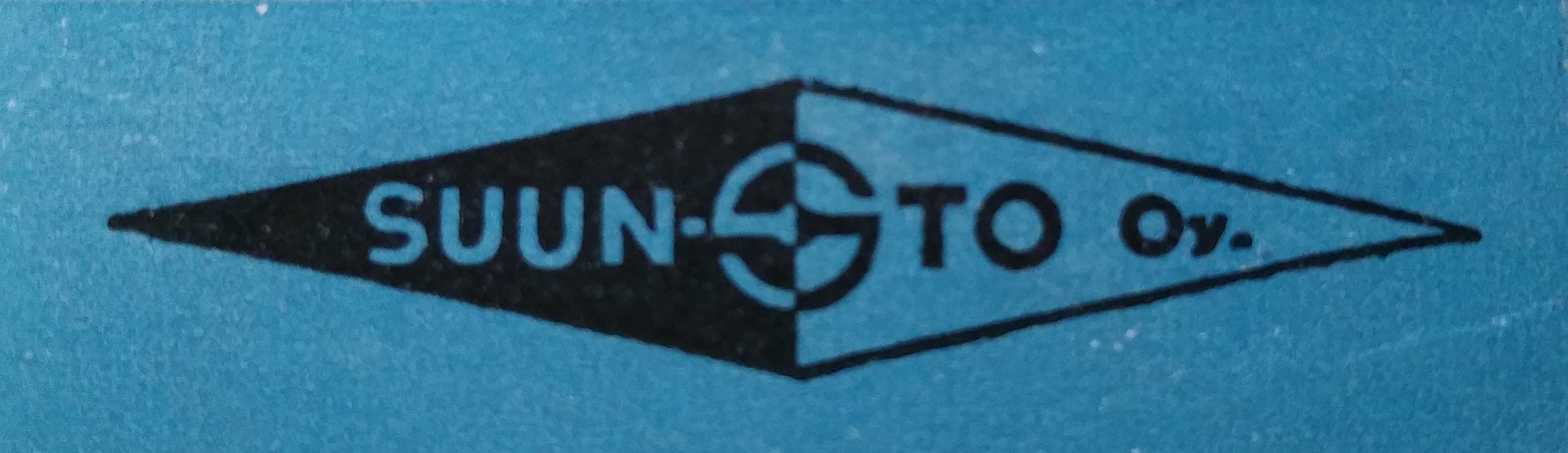
First logo of Suunto

In 1932 the company's founder, Tuomas Vohlonen, a surveyor by profession, applied for a patent for a unique method of filling and sealing a lightweight compass housing made entirely of celluloid and filled with liquid to dampen the needle and to protect it from shock and wear due to excessive motion.

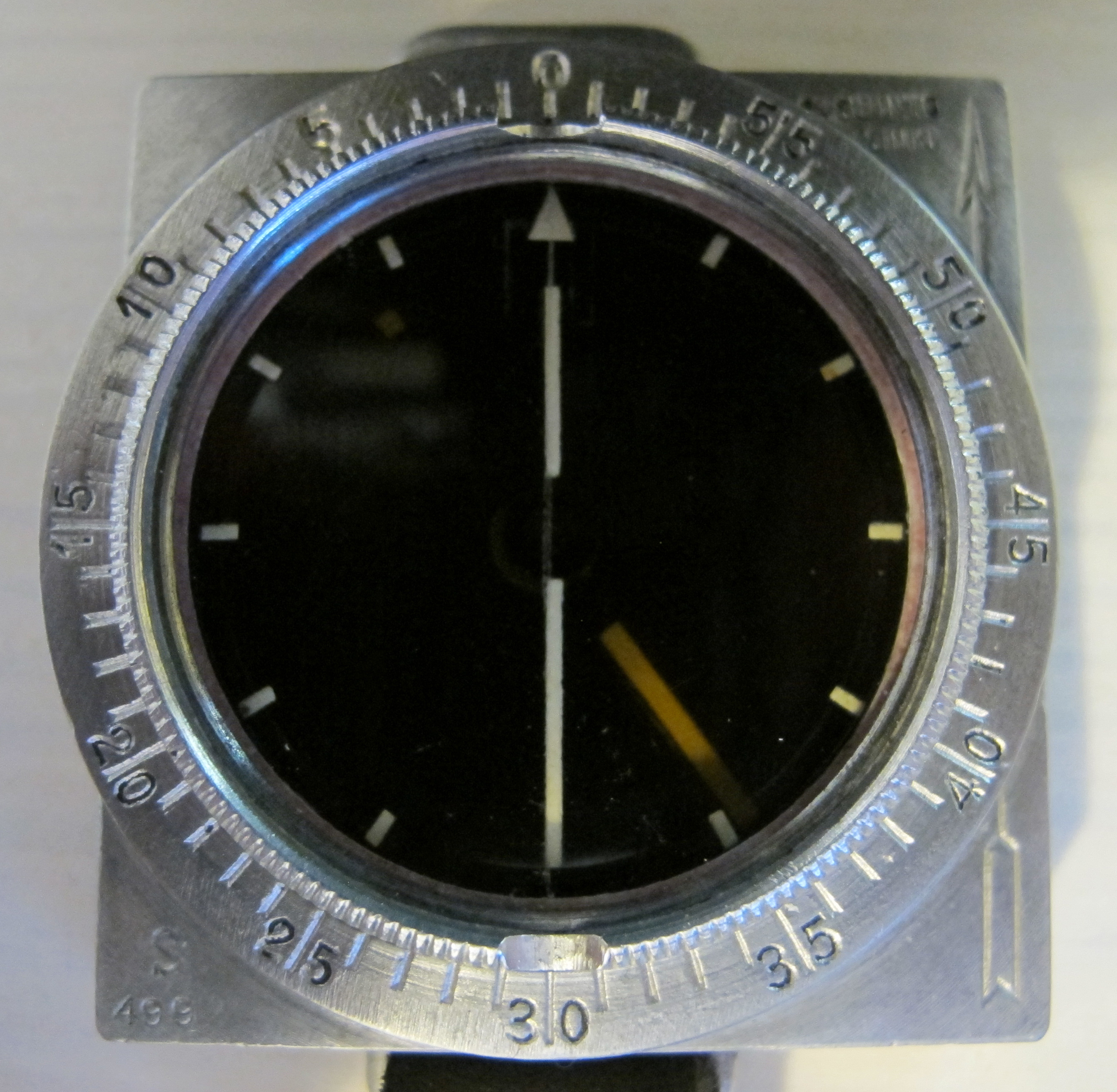
The Suunto M-311 went into mass production in 1936

In 1935, Vohlonen was granted a patent on his design, and it went into mass production a year later as the wrist-mount Suunto M-311. Although it was not the first portable liquid-filled compass, Vohlonen's design was compact and lightweight, enabling it to be easily worn on the wrist. With minor changes, the M-311 was later adopted by the Finnish Army as the M-34.

The company was entered in the trade register on February 4, 1936.

During World War II, Suunto introduced a compact liquid sighting compass, the M/40, for artillery officers and other users needing a precision instrument for measuring an azimuth. The company grew rapidly after the war, supplying compasses and other navigational instruments to both civilian and military markets.

After Tuomas Vohlonen died in 1939, his widow Elli Vohlonen ran the company until 1952, when she sold it to Paavo Kajanne, Aarne Mahnala and Veli-Jussi Hölsö, who also owned Redox Oy. At the very end of 1970s they sold the company to Niemistö family, and in the beginning of 1990s Sponsor Oy bought the company and listed it in a stock exchange in 1995. In 1999 Amer Sports bought the company.

In 1996, Suunto Oy acquired Recta SA, a Swiss compass manufacturer.

In the late 1930s Suunto Oy was located in the backyard building of Laivanvarustajankatu 8, Ullanlinna, Helsinki. In 1959 Suunto moved to Itämerenkatu 52, Ruoholahti, Helsinki. In 1969 the company moved to Juvan teollisuuskatu 8, Juvanmalmi, Espoo. Suunto Oy's headquarters moved to its current location in Valimotie 7, Tammisto, Vantaa in 2001.

== Compass products ==
Suunto makes a wide variety of magnetic compasses, including the A and M series for general navigation, the Arrow series of compasses for competitive orienteering and KB (KäsiBussoli, engl. hand bearing compass), MB (=MatchBox) and MC (=Mirror Compass) lines for those requiring a professional-quality hand bearing compass. Suunto also produces the Recta lines of compasses, including DT baseplate series based on Suunto designs, the DS series of mirror sighting compasses, the Recta Clipper micro compasses, and the famous DP 'matchbox' series of military compasses invented by Recta in 1941. In 2009, Suunto discontinued the Swiss-made Recta DO series, moving all remaining production of Recta compasses from Biel, Switzerland to its production facility in Vantaa, Finland.

After acquiring Recta AG in 1996, Suunto incorporated the Recta Turbo 20 global needle system technology originally patented by Recta SA into many of its own compass designs.

Since 1967, successors of M-40 have been offered as KB line, which consists of high-quality hand-bearing surveying compasses and inclinometers that are accurate to fractions of a degree. Traditionally made of a solid block of machined aluminum, each KB compass contains a magnetized dial with calibration markings printed along its outer edge. A magnifying lens (KB-14) or prismatic sight (KB-77) is mounted at one end of the instrument with a crosshair providing a view of the disc, containing both forward and reciprocal bearings. In operation, the user divides their field of vision with the instrument, using the device's lens or prism to precisely measure the bearing of the object in view. Suunto has since discontinued production of the KB-77. A newer model, the KB-20, utilizes a housing composed of high-impact plastic to allow the compass to float if dropped into water.

=== Global Needle System ===
The Suunto Global Needle System acquired from Recta as the Turbo-20 needle design, the conventional magnetized compass needle is not used. Instead, the compass needle and magnet are built as separate units functioning independently from each other. The needle is fixed at its pivot by means of a double bearing, while the magnet rotates on a pivot with its own jeweled bearing. When attracted by the Earth's magnetic field, the separate compass magnet absorbs the vertical force of the magnetic field, so that the inclination angle of the magnetic field (magnetic dip) cannot tilt the needle, and the needle can no longer move in a vertical plane. This provides accurate readings of magnetic north in all magnetic zones of the world. The design also permits accurate readings with the compass tilted at angles of up to 20 degrees, while the use of a strong magnet causes the needle to settle extremely quickly, facilitating fast and accurate bearing/course measurements. This allows a user to obtain fairly accurate compass bearings even when moving, such as when hiking or traveling in a canoe.

=== Military models ===
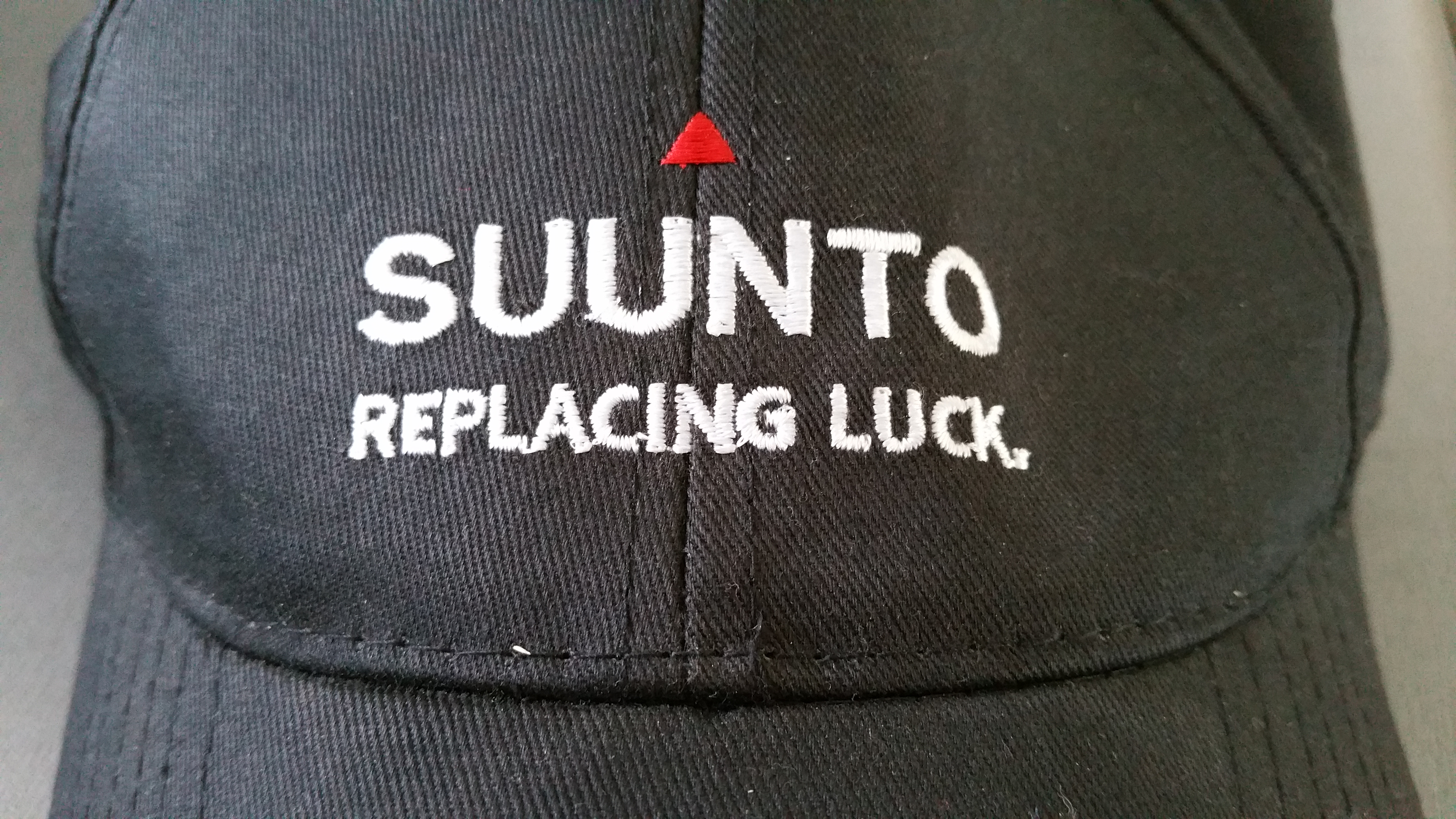
Suunto logo with earlier "Replacing luck" mantra on a cap

The first military compass produced by Suunto and adopted by the Finnish Army was the M-34, a wrist compass with an aluminum housing, which was also produced by Physica of Helsinki. Both companies engaged in a long court battle over ownership of the M-34 design, which lasted until the early 1950s. In 1989, the Finnish Army adopted the Suunto M89-60 wrist compass with a composite baseplate, followed by the M-801 with aluminum housing. Suunto baseplate compasses used by mountaineering, expeditionary, and rescue organizations around the world include the MC-2, KB-14, A-30, and M5 NATO (RA-69) along with the M-9 and Clipper wrist compasses. The MC-2 optical-sight (mirror) compass, RA-69 and several other Suunto compasses have been issued to various NATO military forces over the years, including the British Army, Canadian Land Forces and several U.S. Special Forces units. The Recta DP-6 matchbox-style compass is still used by the Swiss Army.

== Sport watches ==
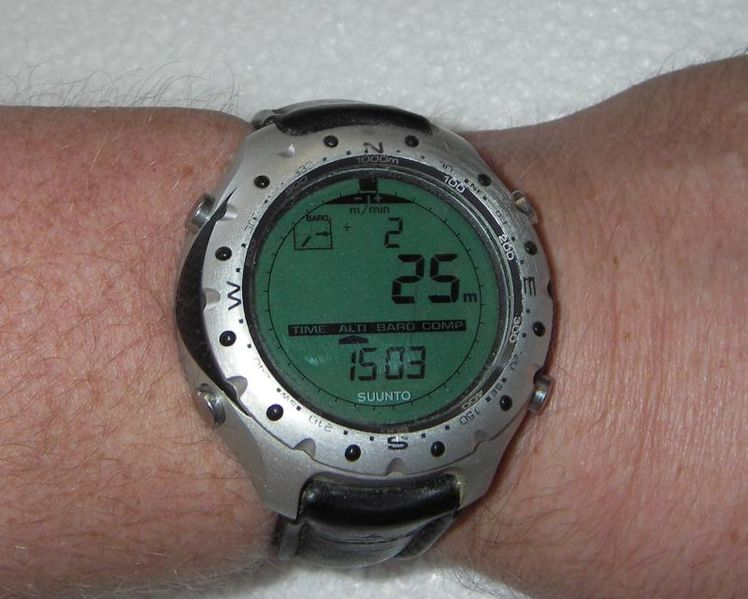
Suunto X-lander

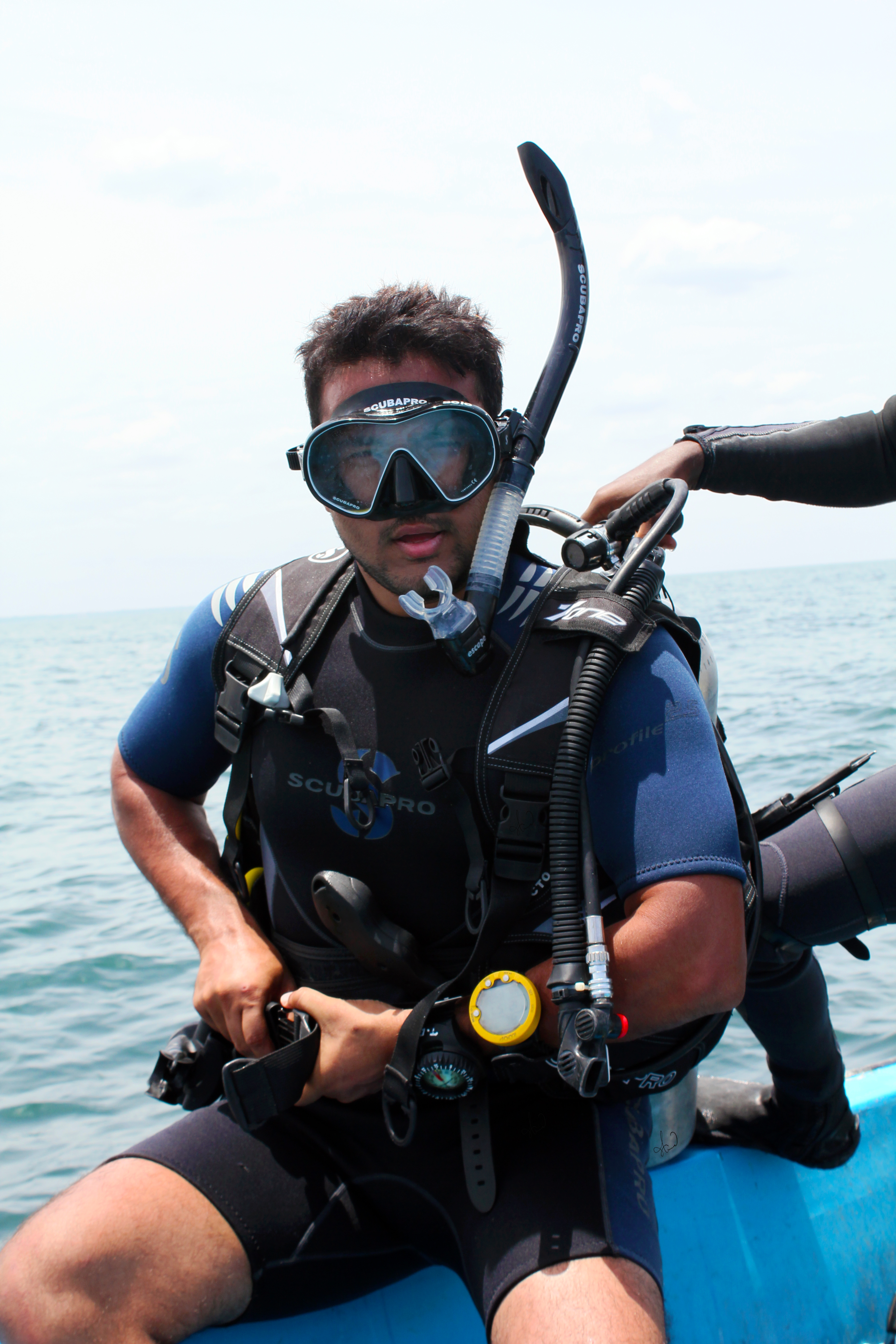
Diver wearing Suunto Zoop dive computer

Suunto makes multi-function electronic wristwatches such as the Core, Ambit, Vector, X-Lander, and X10, which can provide a variety of functions including compass bearings, altitude, training effect and even GPS location, depending on model. Suunto's multi-function electronic sport watches are made for different sports like sailing, golfing, hiking, mountaineering, alpine skiing and training.

G-, S-, T- and X-series of sport watches present an era when products with number 3 were described as entry level, number 6 as advanced and 9 as professional or high-end.

Suunto Vector was the world's first outdoor watch with ABC (altimeter, barometer and compass) functions. Released in 1998, it was available almost unchanged until it was discontinued in 2015. There was also a HR version of Vector, adding basic heart rate functions.

Suunto T6 with its later versions T6C (=Comfort belt) and T6D (=Dual belt) was one of the most advanced among heart rate monitors at the time of its release in 2004. It has, among other features, rate-to-rate recording of heart rate, an altimeter based on air pressure, calculation of EPOC and training effect and support for external POD devices measuring speed and distance.

Suunto T3 (and its C and D versions) offered many advanced training properties with much lower price than T6. The T4 (with also C and D versions) was close the same as the T3, but it added an electronic coach function. There were also T1 and T1C, a very basic heart monitors in T-series. All T-series versions have gone out of production until 2012.

The M-series are a successor of T-series (except for T6). The M-series is more of an entry-level fitness lineup, while T-series was more aimed at sports training. The M-series include the basic heart monitors M1 and M2 (same watch, different heart rate strap) and M4 and M5 with more advanced functions, most of which electronic coaching for specific goals, such as weight control or improving physical performance. M4 went out of production in 2013.

Suunto Quest is a heart rate monitor aimed at sports training.

Suunto Ambit series, with the first version released in 2012 and later having included Ambit2 and Ambit3 lineups. These include GPS, ABC-functions, rechargeable battery, advanced training functions (in training functions Ambit is a successor of T6) and updatable software. User can modify many of the functions of Ambit according to individual preferences. Different apps are also available, and users can also create their own apps. Limited in production amounts, Ambit2 S Black Limited Edition has been available from June 2015. Ambit3 adds smartphone connectivity as its main improvement. On September 29, 2015 Ambit3 Peak Nepal Edition was released. There is no other difference between this and the normal version besides "Nepal Edition" text on the screen and a bit different bezel, but of every watch sold are donated to Red Cross for humanitarian aid and rebuilding in Nepal. On January 7, 2016 Ambit3 Vertical was introduced. It adds more comprehensive tracking of vertical movement and introduces a redesigned body.

Suunto Core is an ABC-watch (A=altitude, B=barometer, C=compass). Since its release in 2007 there has been more than 30 different versions of Core. All of them have the same functions, but their external appearance differ. Most versions have plastic frames, but some are made of aluminum and two of them are made of stainless steel. Most of the Core versions are no longer in production. There are some limited, numbered editions of Core, such as Everest Edition (8848 made, in honor of Apa Sherpa's 21 ascents on Mount Everest), Red Bull X-Alps Edition (864 made, according to the length of the race), and Extreme Edition (3000 made). Suunto celebrated its 75th anniversary by releasing Anniversary Edition (in some countries known as Alpine edition). Core All Black is often erroneously referred to as Core All Black Military or Core Military, but such nominations are not official and such "military" versions do not exist. Core is said to have named after its including core elements needed in this type of watch.

Suunto Lumi is designed for women. It includes mostly same functions as Core. With special adapter, Lumi can be worn as a pendant. The Finnish word "lumi" translates as "snow". Published in 2007, Lumi was available only for a few years.

Suunto Traverse was released on October 1, 2015. The watch includes ABC-functions, GPS-receiver. It includes many of the functions of Ambit3 but however it is to be a follow-up of Vector and Core as an outdoor watch.

Earlier Suunto has been using Suunto ANT and ANT+ (based on the ANT network standard) protocols in wireless transmission of data. New releases beginning from Ambit3 series are based on Bluetooth low energy. The most basic heart rate monitors have been using analog signal.

Although most of the sport watches are made in Finland, some of the products are made in China by another manufacturer. These include T-series excluding T6, M-series, Quest, Lumi, Core (excluding Alpha Stealth) and most of the PODs. Since the 2010s, Suunto has been successful in its efforts to reduce production in China and increase the share of Finnish manufacturing.

== Lifestyle watches ==
When publishing Kailash, Suunto also introduced their new approach, separating branches: together with Essential and Elementum, Kailash is now forming a new branch called Suunto 7R, which is a collection of lifestyle watches, while watches for sports and performing present a separate category.

Suunto Kailash was published on October 14, 2015. It includes GPS-receiver but premium appear is its main feature. This product is mainly designed for travellers. Kailash is also the first product of forthcoming Suunto world series.

On January 15, 2015, Suunto released Essential collection of premium watches. Functionally these resemble the Core but are made in Finland out of premium materials. Finnish design and manufacture is emphasized, creating contrast with China-made Core.

Suunto also manufactures the Elementum series of premium handmade wristwatches with specialized functions for outdoor (Terra), water activities (Aqua) and sailing (Ventus, discontinued).

== Software ==
Suunto provides software for interpreting recorded data from watches and for controlling them.

For T6 there was Training Manager software and for T3 and T4 there was Training Manager Lite.

In the beginning of 2010 Suunto released Movescount online service. In 2014 Suunto introduced an app for using Movescount functions in iOS mobile devices. After being delayed multiple times, Movescount app for Android was released on May 4, 2015.

On May 4, 2015, Amer Sports announced having acquired Sports Tracker, which was joining forces with Movescount. Later this alliance became a base of Amer Sport digital services.

Suunto 7R -software brings connectivity between compatible 7R -watches and iOS-devices.

In December 2015, Suunto introduced Customizer, a web page to create and order a customized watch according to individual preferences. At first this is available to be done with Ambit3 Peak and Sport.

In 2021, the Movescount web-based online service was closed and replaced by a dedicated Suunto app available for iOS and Android.

In September 2024, Suunto introduced DDFA (Dynamical Detrended Fluctuation Analysis) estimating training zones from heart rate variability in real time. Developed with Monicardi, it enables personalized intensity feedback.

== See also ==
- Polar Electro
- Silva of Sweden
