= Camillo Gioja Barbera =

Italian painter

Camillo Gioja Barbera was a 19th-century Italian painter. He painted aquarelles and oil paintings. Mostly he painted themes displaying rooms populated with aristocrats and clergy. He is recorded in the list of Comanducci. Interesting to know is that the Commanduci guide spelled his name in a faulty way, Cimillo Gioja Barbera signed his works with a double "l".
