= Geological compass =

Type of compass

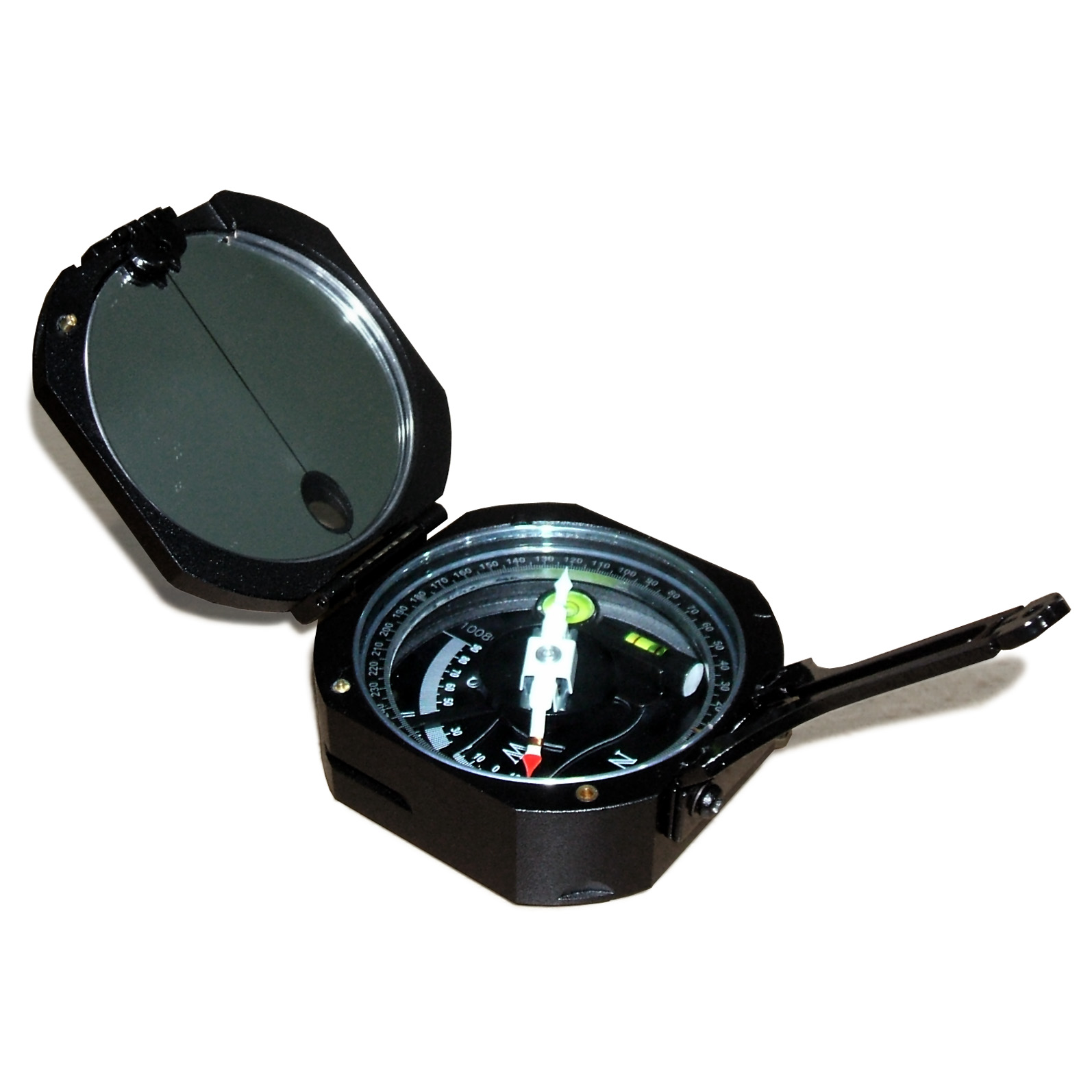
Classic geological compass (Harbin DQL-8), sideview

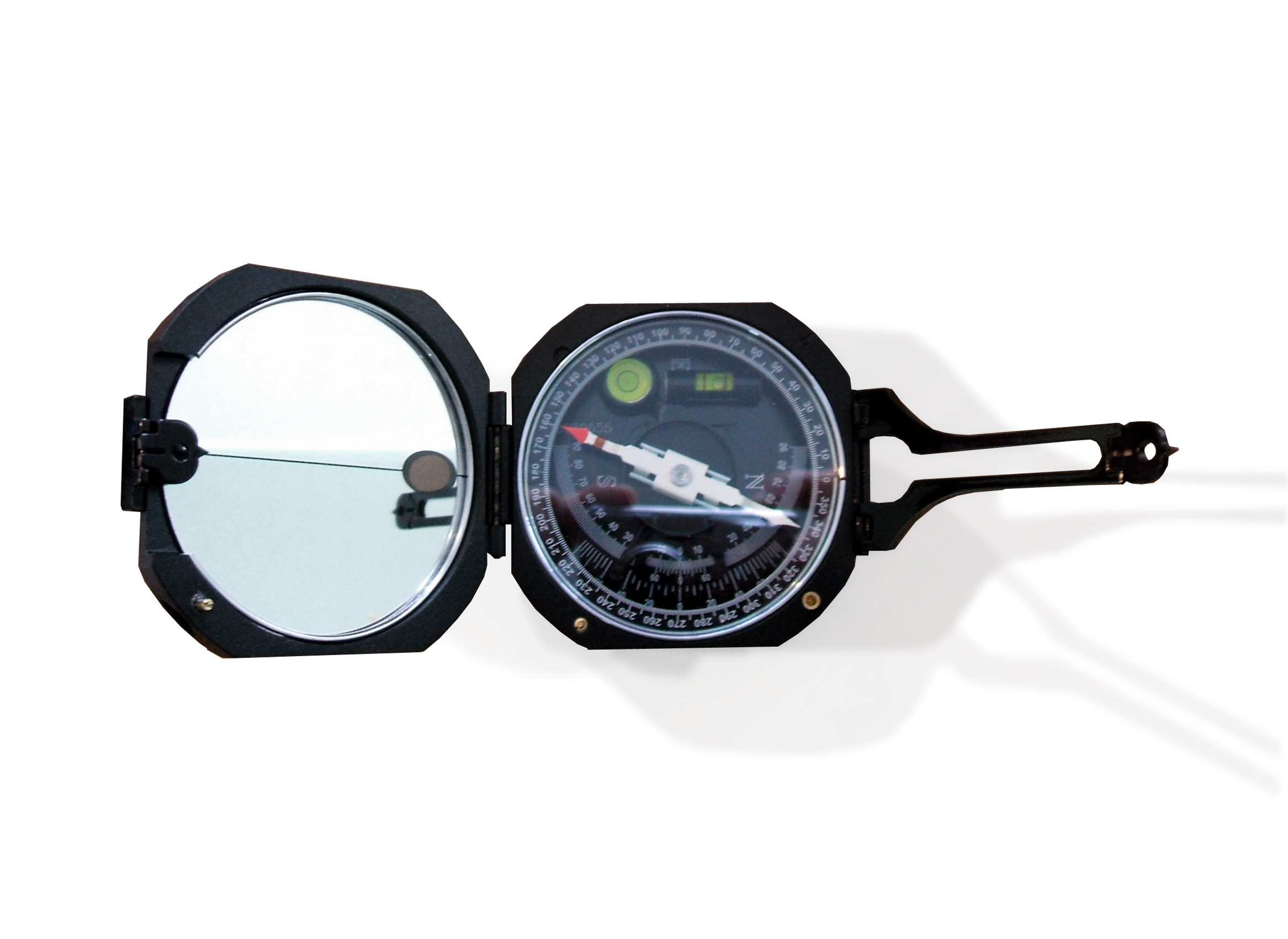
Classic geological compass (Harbin DQL-8), topview

There are a number of different specialized magnetic compasses used by geologists to measure orientation of geological structures, as they map in the field, to analyze and document the geometry of bedding planes, joints, and/or metamorphic foliations and lineations. In this aspect the most common device used to date is the analogue compass.

== Classic geological compasses ==
Classic geological compasses that are of practical use combine two functions, direction finding and navigation (especially in remote areas), and the ability to measure strike and dip of bedding surfaces and/or metamorphic foliation planes. Structural geologists (i.e. those concerned with geometry and the pattern of relative movement) also have a need to measure the plunge and plunge direction of lineations.

Compasses in common use include the Brunton compass and the Silva compass.

== Modern geological compasses ==
Setup of a modern geological compass after Prof. Clar (Freiberger), total view

top view

bottom side

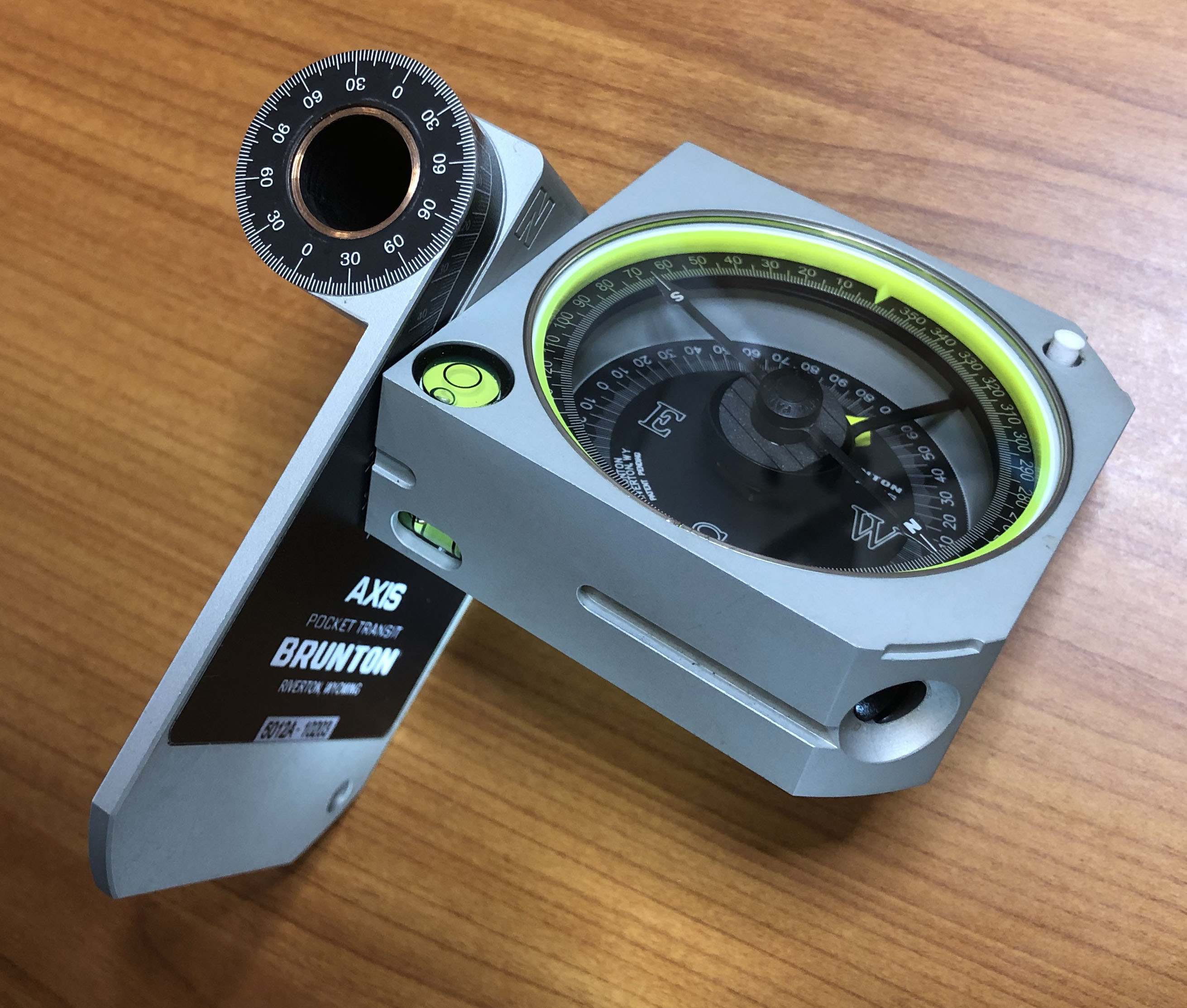
Brunton Axis with simultaneous strike and dip and trend and plunge measurements

The concept of modern geological compass was developed by Eberhard Clar of the University of Vienna during his work as structural geologist, which he published it in 1954. An advantage of his concept is that strike and dip is measured in one step, using the vertical circle for dip angle and the compass for the strike direction. The first implementation was by the VEB Freiberger Präzisionsmechanik in Freiberg, Germany. The details of the design were made in a close cooperation with the Freiberg University of Mining and Technology. In 2016 Brunton Inc. introduced the Axis Pocket Transit which, for the first time, offered simultaneous measurements of both strike and dip and trend and plunge in a variety of configurations. It featured an unconventional lid design that swung a full 360 degrees in both directions and two axes that allow precise measurement of vertical and horizontal angles on all configurations of bedding surfaces.

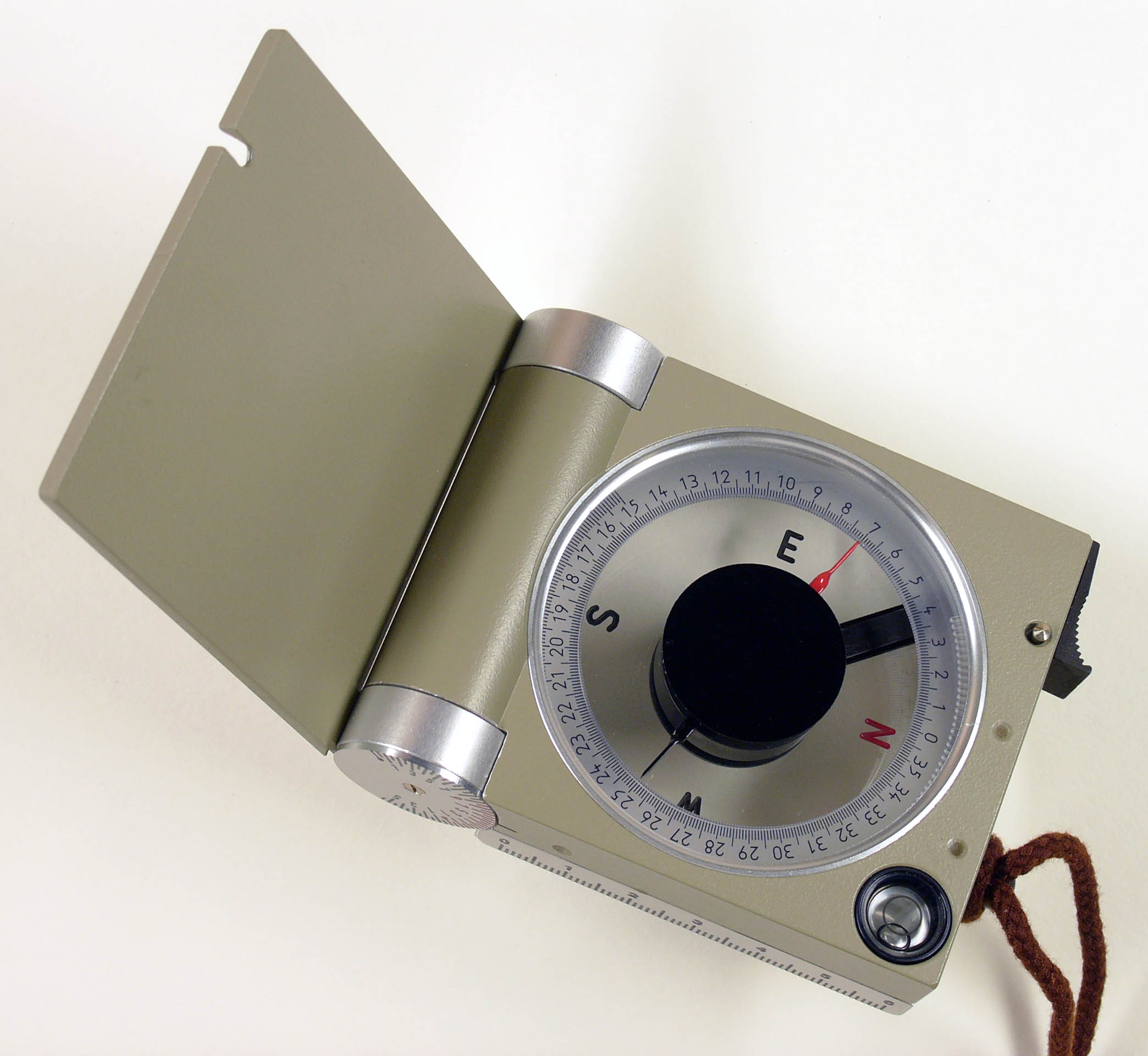
Breithaupt geological compass COCLA with damping of the oscillations of the magnetic needle

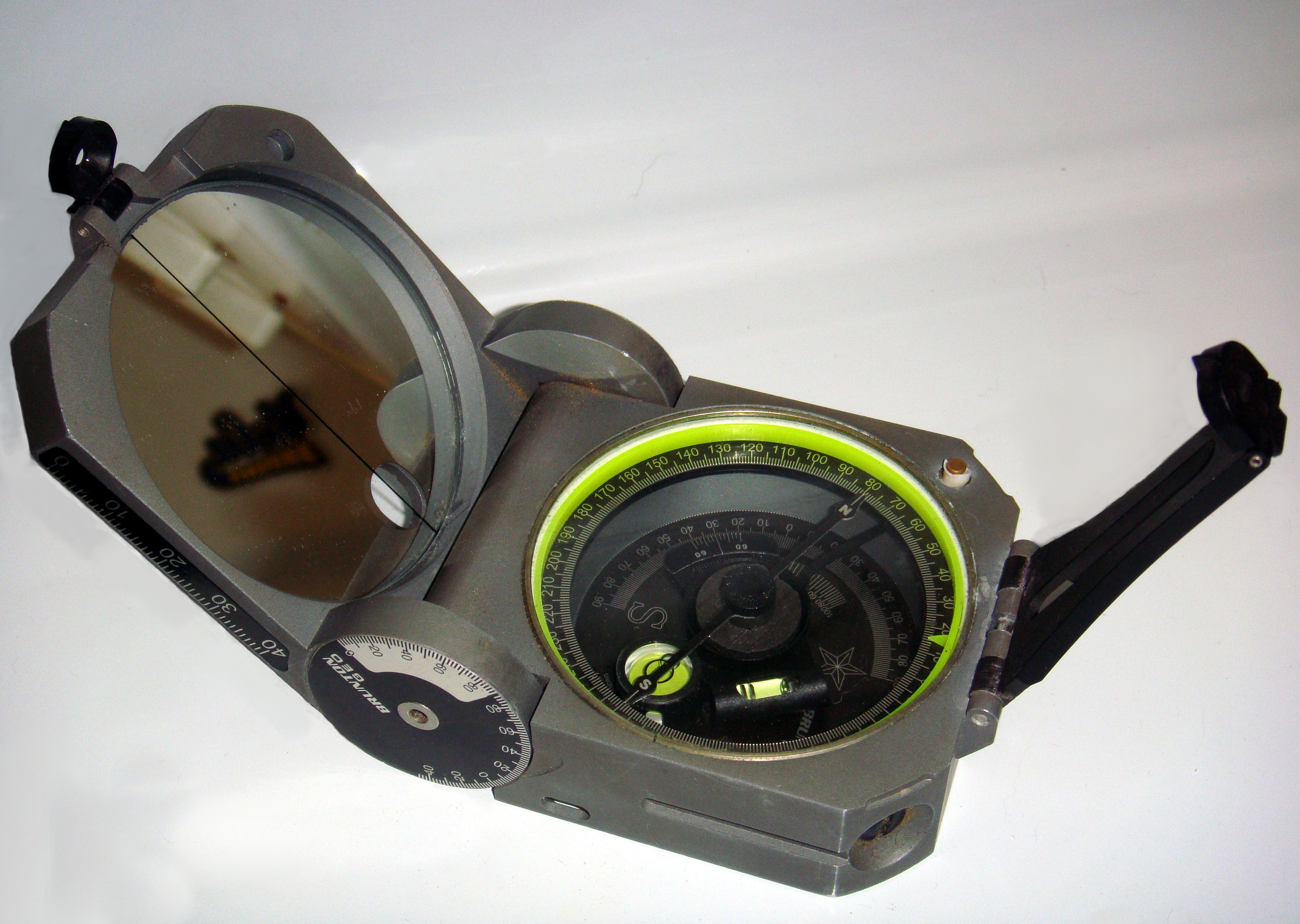
Brunton Pocket Transit, it combines the features of classic and modern geological compasses

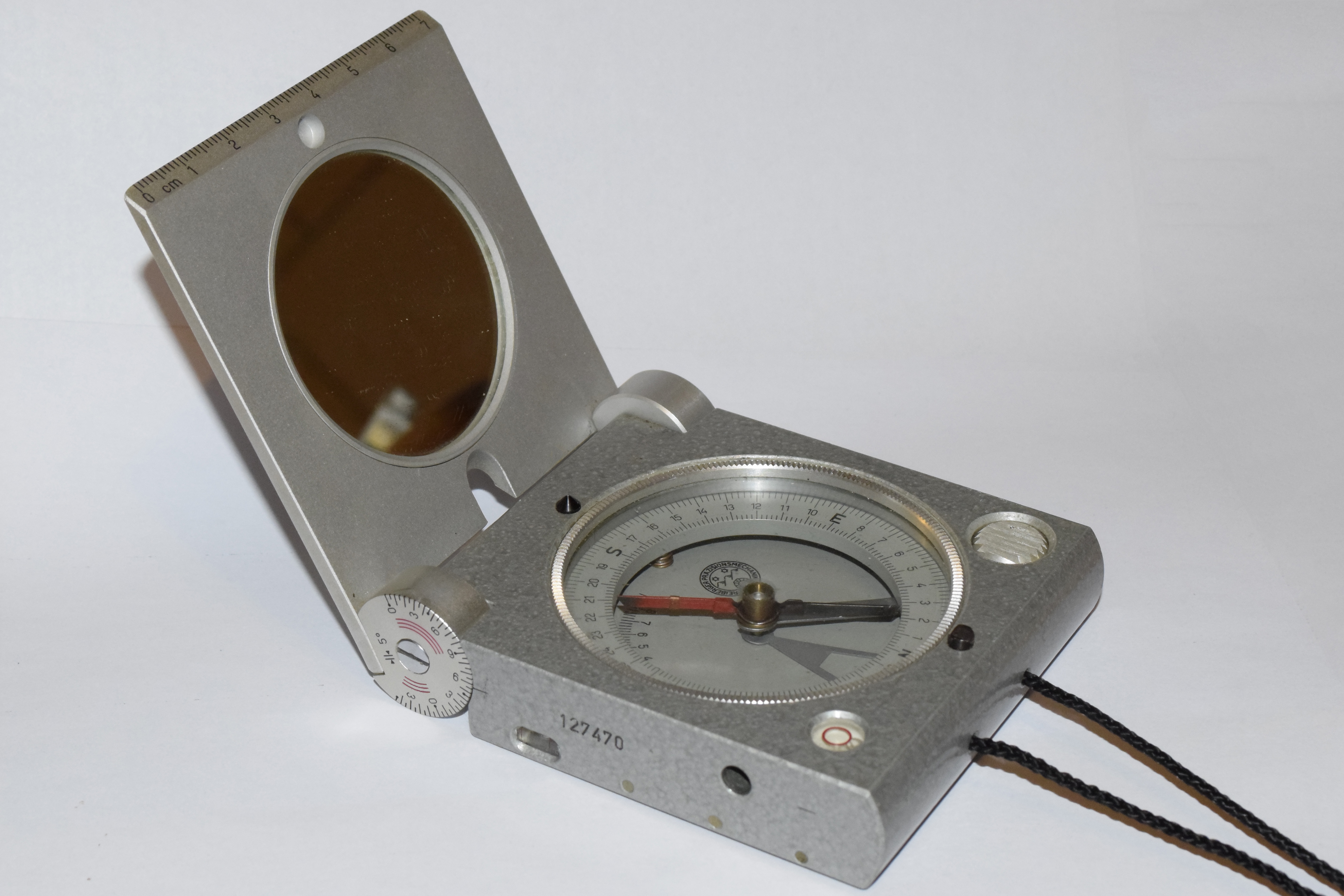
FPM

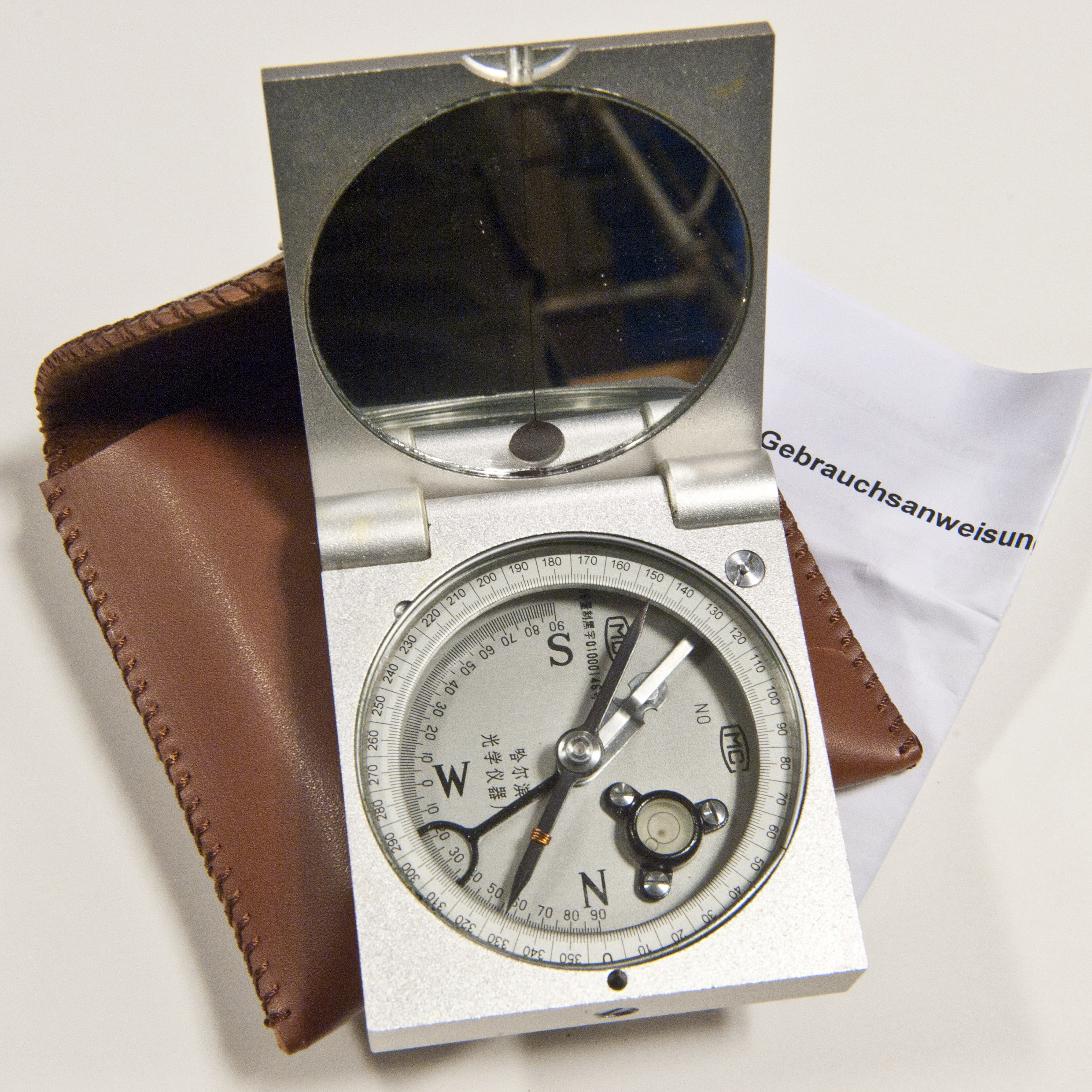
Chinese geological compass

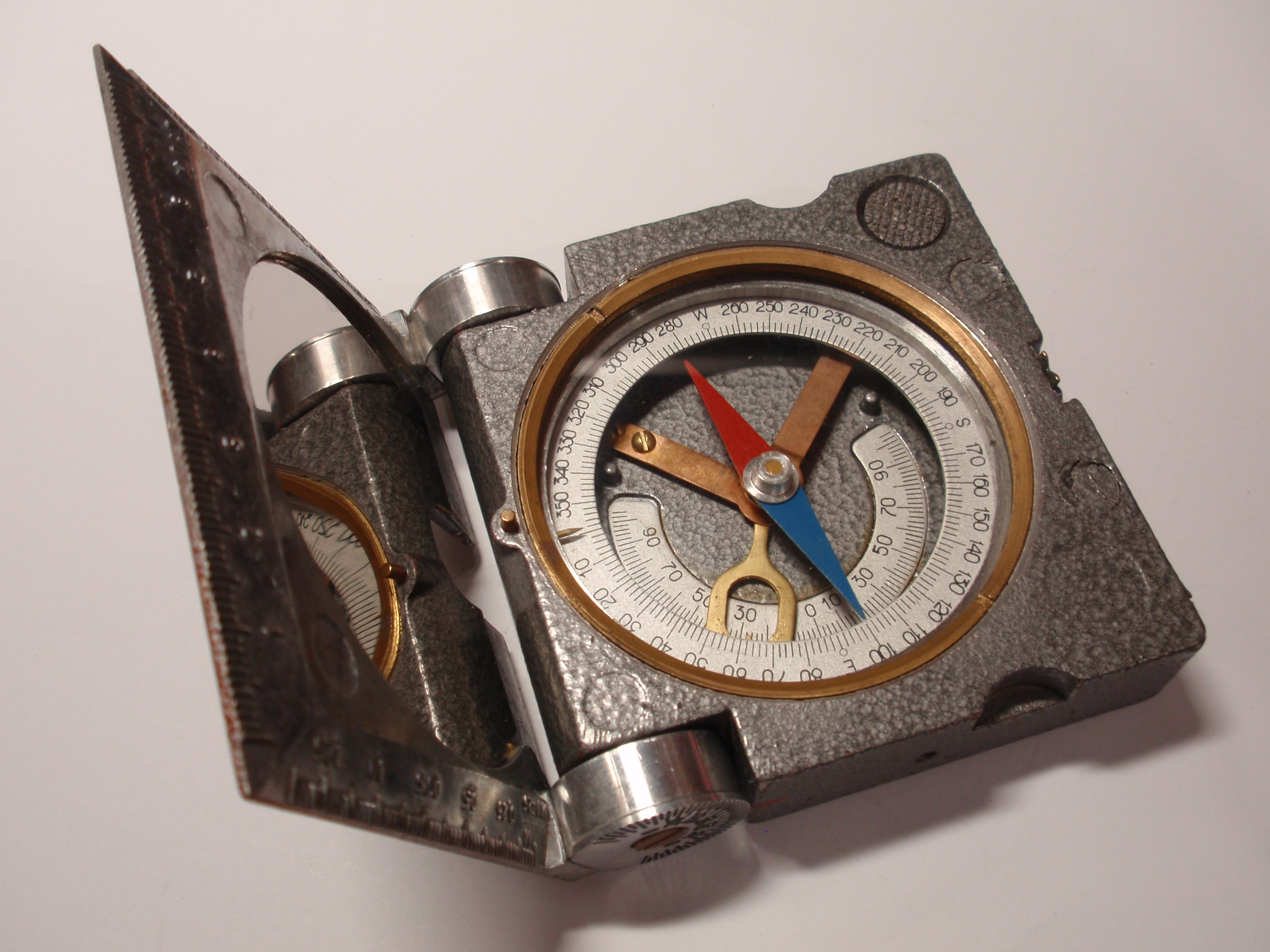
Russian geological compass

=== Usage ===
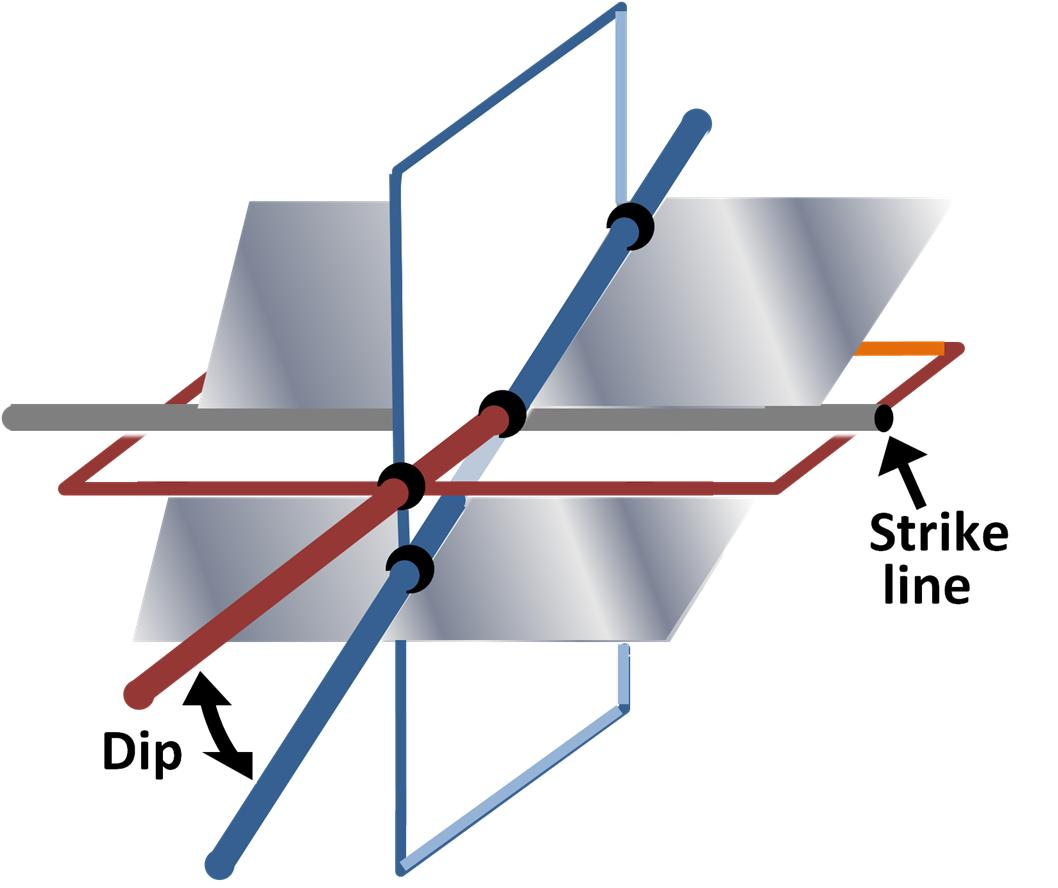
Strike line and dip of a plane describing attitude relative to a horizontal plane and a vertical plane perpendicular to the strike line

Geological compasses are distinctive because of the anti-clockwise direction of the numbers on the compass dial. This is because the compass is used to determine dip and dip-direction of surfaces (foliations), and plunge and plunge-direction of lines (lineations). To use the compass one aligns the lid of the compass with the orientation of the surface to be measured (to obtain dip and dip direction), or the edge of the lid of the compass with the orientation of the line (to obtain plunge and plunge direction). The compass must be twisted so that the base of the compass becomes horizontal, as accomplished using the spirit level incorporated in it. The needle of the compass is then freed by using the side button, and allowed to spin until the damping action slows its movement, and then stabilises. The side button is released and the needle is then firmly held in place, allowing the user thereafter to conveniently read the orientation measured. One first reads the scale that shows the angle subtended by the lid of the compass, and then depending on the colour shown (red or black) the end of the compass needle with the corresponding colour. Data are then recorded as (for example) 25°->333° (dip and dip-direction) or (plunge and plunge-direction).

This compass has the most use by structural geologists, measuring foliation and lineation in metamorphic rocks, or faults and joints in mining areas.

== Digital compasses ==
With the advent of the smartphone, geological compass programs based on the 3-axis teslameter and the 3-axis accelerometer have also begun to appear. These compass programs use vector algebra to compute plane and lineation orientations from the accelerometer and magnetometer data, and permit rapid collection of many measurements. However, some problems are potentially present. Measurements made by smartphone geological compasses can potentially be susceptible to noise, mainly due to vibration or rapid hand movement. Users of a smartphone compass should carefully calibrate their devices and run several tests against traditional magnetic compasses in order to understand the limitations of their chosen program.

With traditional compasses there is no record of error caused by poor damping or operator movement. This limitation is removed by use of a digital compass, though these may be more error prone because of the sensitivity of the accelerometer, which programs use to determine vertical and horizontal. Therefore, professional use of a digital geological compass requires the recoding of variance in individual measurements. There is no data that suggests digital compasses are subject to any measurable form of magnetic disturbance.

Modern remote sensing techniques as LiDAR and photogrammetry allow to obtain accurate and dense 3D point clouds. These point clouds allow the measurement of orientations of planar surfaces. Jordá et al. performed a comparison of the orientations of discontinuities measured by means of classical geological compass and a photogrammetric 3D point cloud demonstrating that remote sensing field discontinuity collection provides a reliable alternative to the use of geological compass.
