= Björn Kjellström =

- Born: September 9, 1910; Sweden
- Died: August 26, 1995 (aged 84); Sweden
- Known for: Orienteering and Silva compass

Björn Kjellström (September 9, 1910 – August 26, 1995), originally from Sweden, was a ski orienteering champion in Sweden and co-founder of the compass manufacturing company Silva Sweden AB which produced the Silva compass. More than 25 million Silva compasses have been sold since the founding of the company.

== Early life ==
Kjellström competed in his first orienteering race in Sweden in May 1928 at the age of 17, where he finished last in the beginners' class. However, by the fall of the same year he won a district orienteering championship race outside Stockholm. During the years that followed Kjellström and his brothers won many orienteering races, both individually and as a three-man team.

== Silva Company ==
In 1932, working with his two brothers and a machinist, Gunnar Tillander, Kjellström helped perfect a new type of compass for terrestrial navigation, featuring a liquid-damped magnetized needle housing compass and a protractor built into a transparent baseplate.

In 1946 he moved to the United States, where he founded the U.S. operations of the Silva Company (later Silva, Inc.) in La Porte, Indiana. Two years later, he organized Silva Ltd. in Toronto, Canada for sales in Canada. Kjellström also organized Silva Orienteering Services of La Porte Indiana to provide training and company sponsorship for the sport of orienteering in North America.

In 1955 Kjellström published a very popular book on outdoor land navigation and the sport of orienteering, Be Expert With Map and Compass. To date, it has sold more than 500,000 copies in English and has been translated into several languages, and has remained continuously in print since its first publication.

Kjellström co-founded the United States Orienteering Federation in 1971 and served as vice president of the International Ski Federation from 1951 to 1979. Johnson Worldwide Associates (JWA), later Johnson Outdoors, Inc. bought Silva Inc. in 1973, and production shifted back to Sweden in 1981. As of 1995, the Silva compass was made in more than 50 models.

== Later years ==
In later years Kjellström moved to Pound Ridge, N.Y., where he helped develop trails in a county park and forest reserve called Ward Pound Ridge Reservation and to produce a detailed orienteering map of the area. He continued to be active until his death in promoting the Silva compass brand in the USA and the sport of orienteering, as well as conducting promotional book tours for revised versions of Be Expert With Map and Compass.

Kjellström died 26 August 1995 in a hospital in Stockholm, Sweden due to complications of Parkinson's disease.

== Postscript ==
After Kjellström's death, the Swedish parent company, Silva of Sweden AB, decided to end its North American distribution agreement with Silva Inc./Silva Ltd. and Johnson Worldwide Associates (JWA). JWA claimed the right to the Silva brand in North America, along with several names used for Silva compass models ('Ranger', Explorer, etc.). After two years of litigation, Silva of Sweden AB and JWA aka Johnson Outdoors agreed to confirm JWA's exclusive right to distribute compasses under the Silva name in the USA and Canada. From 1998, Johnson Outdoors distributed Silva compasses in North America made to its specifications by third-party manufacturers, while Silva of Sweden AB distributed compasses assembled at its Haninge, Sweden facility to markets outside of North America, and later from production facilities in China.

In 2018, Silva of Sweden AB reacquired North American distribution rights to the Silva brand from Johnson Outdoors, and once again distributes all Silva brand compasses to Canada and the USA.

== Sources ==
Information derived from NYTimes obituary
