= Brunton compass =

Precision compass made by Brunton, Inc. of Riverton, Wyoming

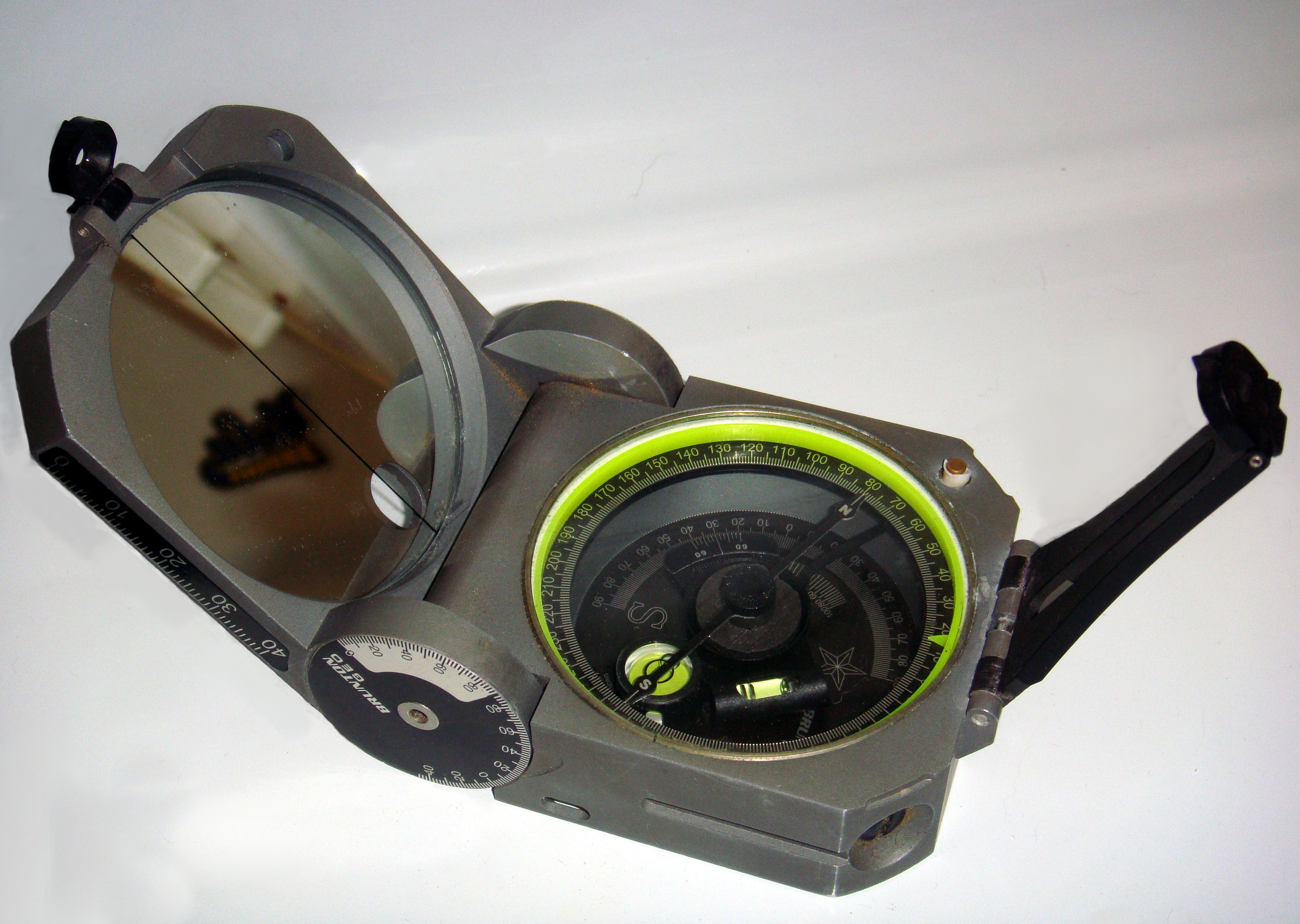
A standard Brunton Geo, used commonly by geologists

A Brunton compass, properly known as the Brunton Pocket Transit, is a precision compass made by Brunton, Inc. of Riverton, Wyoming. The instrument was patented in 1894 by Canadian-born geologist David W. Brunton. Unlike most modern compasses, the Brunton Pocket Transit utilizes magnetic induction damping rather than fluid to damp needle oscillation. Although Brunton, Inc. makes many other types of magnetic compasses, the Brunton Pocket Transit is a specialized instrument used widely by those needing to make accurate navigational and slope-angle measurements in the field. Users are primarily geologists, but archaeologists, environmental engineers, mining engineers and surveyors also make use of the Brunton's capabilities. The United States Army has adopted the Pocket Transit as the M2 Compass for use by crew-served artillery.

== Overview ==
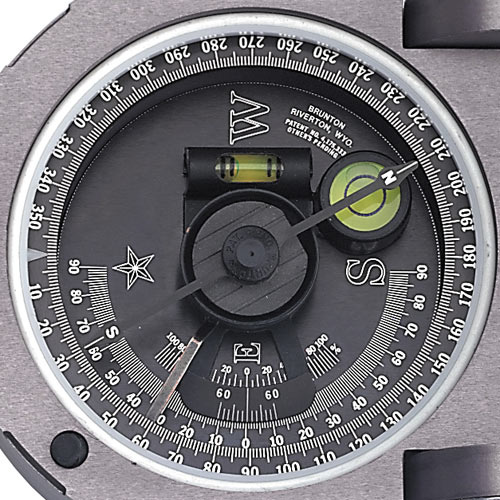
Showing spirit level and bull's eye level

The Pocket Transit may be adjusted for declination angle according to one's location on the Earth. It is used to get directional degree measurements (azimuth) through use of the Earth's magnetic field. Holding the compass at waist-height, the user looks down into the mirror and lines up the target, needle, and guide line that is on the mirror. Once all three are lined up and the compass is level, the reading for that azimuth can be made. Arguably the most frequent use for the Brunton in the field is the calculation of the strike and dip of geological features (faults, contacts, foliation, sedimentary strata, etc.). Strike is measured by leveling (with the bull's eye level) the compass along the plane being measured. Dip is taken by laying the side of the compass perpendicular to the strike measurement and rotating horizontal level until the bubble is stable and the reading has been made. If field conditions allow, additional features of the compass allow users to measure such geological attributes from a distance.

As with most traditional compasses, directional measurements are made in reference to the Earth's magnetic field. Thus, measurements are sensitive to magnetic interference. For example, if the user is near an outcrop that contains magnetite or some other iron-bearing material, compass readings can be affected anywhere from several inches from the outcrop to tens of yards away (depending on the strength of the magnetic field). Since they are measured with a rotating level, dip measurements are unaffected by magnetic interference.

== Other compasses ==
There are numerous other compasses used by geologists: The Breithaupt compass is one example. Portable electronic devices are changing the way geologists conduct field work. Unlike analogue compasses, a digital compass relies on an accelerometer and a magnetometer, and may provide information about the reliability of a measurement (e.g. by repeating the same measurement and performing statistical analysis).

== Uses ==
1. Taking a bearing
2. Measuring vertical angles with clinometer
3. Defining points of the same elevation
4. Measuring strike and dip.
