= Eureka! Tent Company =

Outdoor recreation supply company

Eureka! Tent Company was an American company that sold Eureka! Brand outdoor recreation products. The brand, part of outdoor recreation company Johnson Outdoors Inc., is headquartered in Binghamton, New York.

On October 19, 2023, Johnson Outdoors announced they were exiting the Eureka! business, and would discontinue selling the products by the end of 2024.

== History ==
The Eureka Tent & Awning Company was established prior to 1895 in Binghamton, New York. The company's initial workshop on Binghamton's Commercial Avenue produced custom tents, awnings, wagon covers, horse blankets, and flags. The company utilized early manufacturing processes, including using dyes to cut stars and sewing strips of red and white bunting to create American flags. Eureka constructed its first awnings from unfinished natural white cotton duck and designed them to maximize the light allowed into the storefront while providing sufficient shade to passers-by. Eureka's earliest tents, assembled from untreated white army duck, were so robust that a completely usable early Eureka tent still hung in the company's headquarters nearly one hundred years later.

In 1910, pioneering businessmen, Arthur D. Legg and Walter A. Dickerman purchased the company from its original owners. Legg's son, Arthur Carl Legg, bought out Dickerman's interest in 1925. The company continued under the Legg family for the next fifty-six years.

In 1930, the Leggs purchased the former Chenango Canal mule barn in Binghamton, which they converted into Eureka's first factory. By World War II, the Leggs had expanded Eureka to include five New York factories. The company supplied the design and production for what became known as "tent cities," such as when approximately one thousand IBM salesmen met with IBM founder Thomas J. Watson, Sr. in 1946. Eureka tents for this meeting included sleeping tents with wooden floors, mess tents, product display tents, portrait-taking tents, and shoe-shining tents, all spanned 7 acres (28,000 m^{2}) of land at the Hundred Percent Club in Endicott, New York.

During World War II, Eureka manufactured primarily all-purpose tents for the armed forces, which were used as hospital tents, barracks, and mess halls. After the war, the company consolidated its factories into one expanded factory and became a wholesale manufacturer of canvas products and a supplier of industrial canvas and other textiles. In the 1950s, Eureka's trailer awnings experienced increased demand when the soldiers’ return led to the subsequent housing shortage. Due to this demand, Eureka began distributing its products through sporting goods stores, Army and Navy stores, and department stores throughout the United States and internationally.

In 1959, Arthur C. Legg stepped down to become chairman of Eureka's board and the board elected Legg's son-in-law Robert B. DeMartine to the position of company president. DeMartine, then president of the Canvas Goods Association, had been with the company for eight years.

During the 1960s, Eureka progressed beyond manufacturing heavy canvas to marketing to the growing outdoor camping industry. Lightweight cotton cloth tents accounted for 90% of the company's sales, supported by news of Eureka's role in the first all-American Mount Everest expedition and the development of the first free-standing, quick-to-set-up tent, the Draw-Tite. Towards the end of the decade, Eureka experimented with lightweight and weather-resistant nylon, producing the Mt. Katahdin, one of the first high-volume double-wall construction nylon tents coated with waterproof urethane.

In 1973, Johnson Wax Associates (later Johnson Worldwide Associates and Johnson Outdoors, Inc.), a subsidiary of the then-titled Johnson Wax (now S.C. Johnson, Inc.) of Racine, Wisconsin, purchased Eureka and all of its facilities. The company continued operation in Binghamton under DeMartine, posting record sales that year. Eureka's highlight in the 1970s was the development of the Timberline model, the first free-standing lightweight backpacking tent in the industry; and because of its adoption and use by many young scouts during this time period, the Timberline is somewhat visually iconic to the Boy Scouts of America. The company continued to benefit from the backpacking and "back to nature" camping boom of the 1970s.

In 1980, Johnson Wax Associates consolidated three of its holdings, Eureka Tent & Awning Company (now just Eureka! Tent, Inc.); Camp Trails Company of Phoenix, Arizona, a backpack and sleeping bag manufacturer; and Silva of LaPorte, Indiana, a compass and cross-country ski manufacturer, into Johnson Camping, Inc., which was then headquartered in Eureka's head office in Binghamton. Johnson Wax Associates named Eureka's DeMartine president of the new conglomerate. Through Johnson Camping, Eureka expanded from 300 to 500 employees and from three to five plants in New York, Arizona, Indiana, and Canada.

During the 1980s, Eureka! expanded its camping tent business as camping grew in popularity in North America. Its StormShield tents were carried to the highest mountains on the globe, including during these American and Canadian-led expeditions: Dhaulagiri I (1980), Yalungkang (now known as Kangchenjunga) (1981), Canadian Everest (1982), American Women's Himalayan Expedition to Ama Dablam (1982), Makalu (1983), and American Men & Women on Everest (1983). In 1987, Johnson Worldwide Associates took its holdings public and put around two million shares on the over-the-counter market.

During the 1990s, Eureka! expanded its military tent business. In 1993, Johnson Worldwide Associates moved marketing, sales, research and development, and customer service functions for all of its divisions to Racine, Wisconsin as part of a broader centralization plan.

Organizations and individuals known to have used Eureka! tents over the years include Sir Edmund Hillary on a Himalayan Expedition to Nepal; the nineteen-man team on the first all-American expedition to Mount Everest; the American Women's Himalayan Expedition to Annapurna I; Eric Simonson on two research expeditions to Mount Everest; then-President George H. W. Bush, whom Bass Pro Employees in Springfield, Missouri, spotted purchasing a Eureka! tent in 1991; the Girl Scouts of the USA; the Boy Scouts of America; the Arctic Institute of North America; the United States Department of the Interior; the Geological Survey; the Peace Corps; Lee African Safaris; and the U.S. Navy Operation Deep Freeze.

On October 19, 2023, Johnson Outdoors announced they were exiting the Eureka! business. As part of the announcement, Johnson Outdoors said it would discontinue selling Eureka! products by the end of 2024.

== Use in notable expeditions ==
=== Sir Edmund Hillary’s Himalayan Expedition ===
Sir Edmund Hillary, who in 1953 was one of the first explorers in the world to reach the 29,029-foot (8,848 m) high summit of Mount Everest, made international news along with fellow explorer Dr. Griffith Pugh during their 1960-1961 Himalayan Scientific Mountaineering Expedition to Nepal, a.k.a. "The Silver Hut Expedition." During this expedition, the goal of which was to combine the "wintering over" concept of living in Antarctica with the typical mountain exploration concept of setting up a series of camps along the path to the summit, Hillary and his team were the first famous explorers to use Eureka Draw-Tite tents. Although the team did not reach the summit of Mount Makalu on this expedition due to illness, the weather, and a minor accident, the team spent more than six months living and performing laboratory experiments in the Eureka tents on the Himalayan mountains.

=== James W. Whittaker and the First All-American Everest Expedition ===
Hillary's experience with the Eureka Draw-Tite tents influenced Jim Whittaker a.k.a. James W. Whittaker and Barry C. Bishop, two of nineteen American explorers headed for the first all-American Everest Expedition in 1963, to turn to Eureka to design custom Draw-Tite tents. Working closely with Bishop's and Whittaker's instructions, such as installing heavy-duty brass hooks for attaching the tent to the frame and utilizing "zipper-type vents" to prevent condensation, Eureka improved on the Draw-Tite design to create a total of over 60 lightweight "Mt. Everest Assault Tents" for the expedition, many of which were tested at 10,000 feet (3,000 m) at Mount Rainier the year before. The tents were used in temperatures reaching -20˚ Fahrenheit and from 60 mph+ winds during the three-month trek to the summit. Norman G. Dyhrenfurth, the expedition's leader, stated that much of the expedition's success was due to "our fine new equipment... [such as our] vastly improved tents, with outside frames, that can be set up in a high wind."

=== Eric Simonson and the Mallory and Irvine Research Expeditions ===
When Eric Simonson led a team of nine explorers near the 29,029 ft (8,848 m) summit of Mount Everest in 1999 to uncover the truth about the 1924 expedition of British explorers George Leigh Mallory and Andrew Irvine, the team used Eureka! tents to shelter themselves at the base camp. Simonson's team found Mallory's preserved body but was unable to determine whether he had died before or after reaching the Everest summit. After the first expedition, Simonson told Kurt Heisler, then-senior tent designer for Eureka!, that the Eureka! tents had been "great" and that he and his team of explorers "could have used these tents much higher on the mountain." Heisler offered to design tents for Simonson's next exhibition in 2001, the goal of which was to find Irvine's body and to determine whether Mallory had been the first man to reach the Everest summit, nearly three decades prior to Sir Edmund Hillary's historic expedition. Eureka! donated sixty tents to the expedition, from their largest style of military tents to their lightest and smallest backpacking tents, and designed several custom tents, working closely with the explorers to balance stability and strength. Simonson stated that companies like Eureka! that donated to the expedition "took a risk, believed, and saved lives doing it. [They] essentially... are directly responsible for our strength on the mountain and our ability to work miracles." Eureka! later produced a consumer version of the Fifth Season tent, a tent originally designed for this expedition.

== See also ==
- Johnson Outdoors
