= Jetboil =

American portable stove manufacturer

Jetboil, Inc.
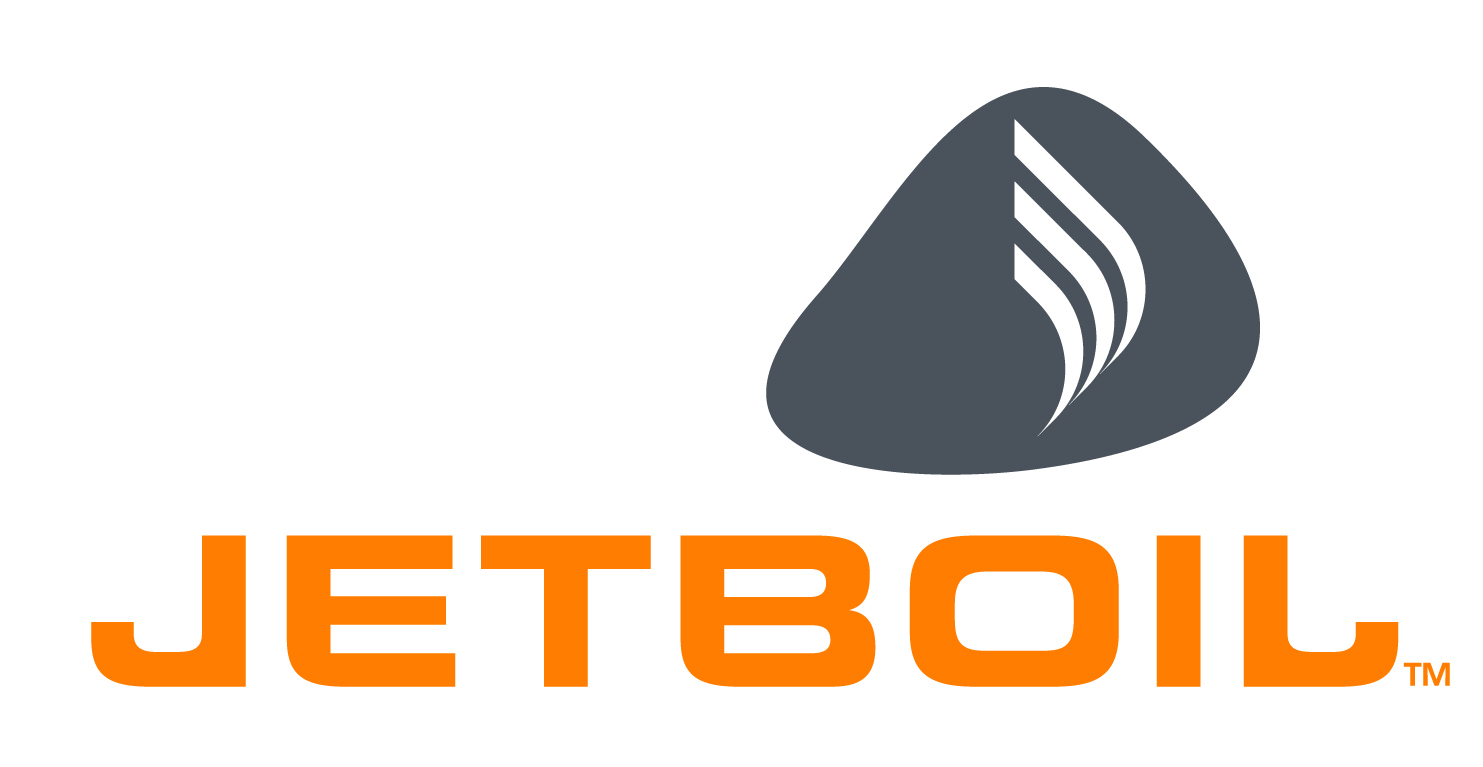
- Current logo
- Company type: Subsidiary
- Industry: Backpacking stoves
- Founded: 2001
- Founder: Dwight Aspinwall, Perry Dowst
- Headquarters: Racine, Wisconsin, United States
- Area served: Worldwide
- Production output: Backpacking stoves
- Operating income: US$25.6 million (2013)
- Net income: US$19.3 million (2013)
- Owner: Johnson Outdoors, Inc.
- Website: jetboil.johnsonoutdoors.com

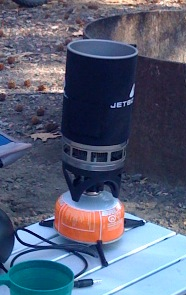
Stove with small fuel canister.

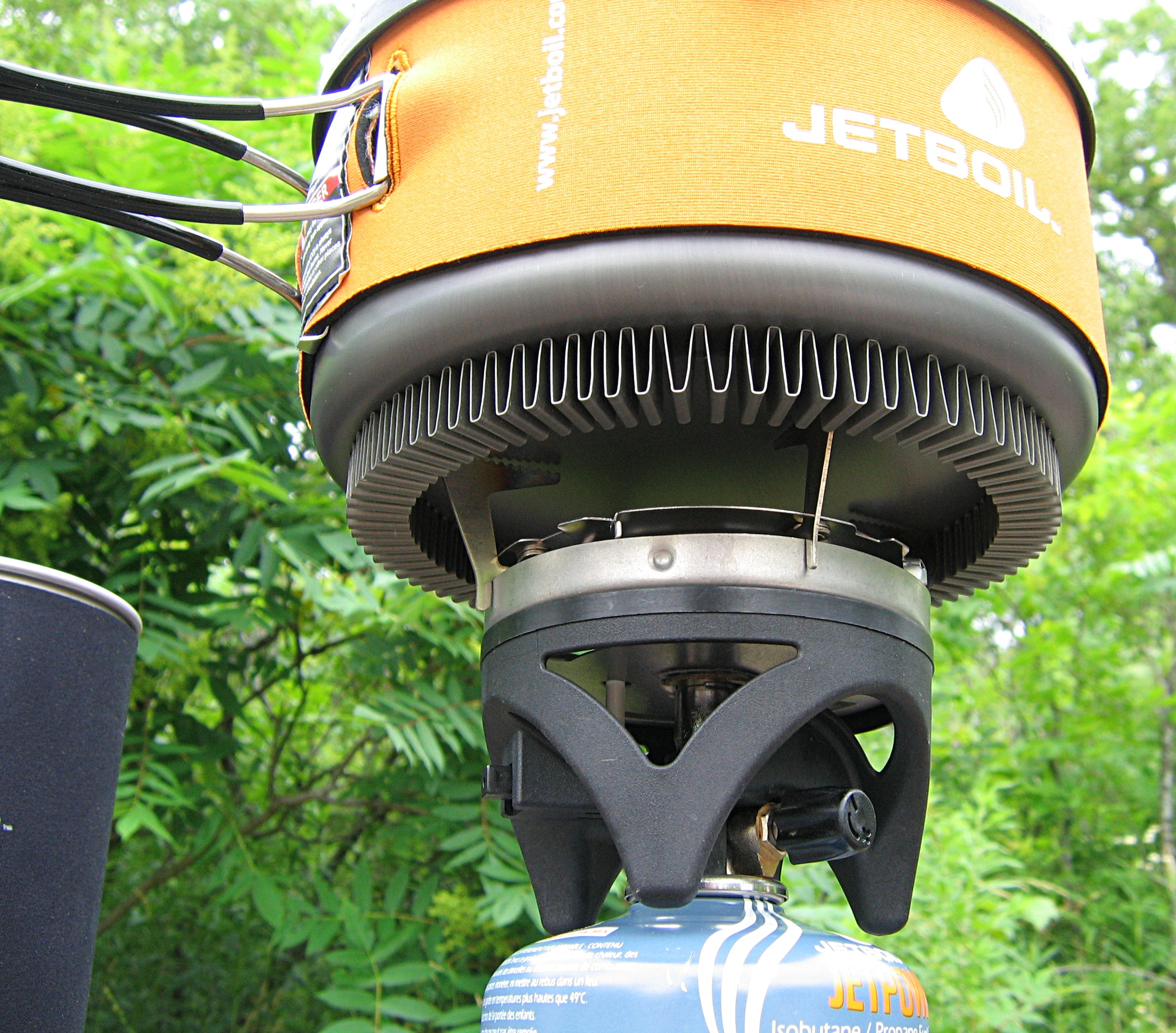
Corrugated metal ring at the base of the billycan.

Jetboil is an American manufacturer of lightweight gas-fueled portable stoves used primarily for backpacking.

The company was formed in 2001 by Dwight Aspinwall and Perry Dowst in a former woolen mill in Guild, New Hampshire, debuting its products at the 2003 Outdoor Retailers trade show. In 2006 the company moved its headquarters to Manchester, New Hampshire and in 2012 was purchased by Racine, Wisconsin–based Johnson Outdoors.

== Stove design ==
Stoves feature a neoprene-insulated pot (billycan), corrugated metal heat exchanger (burner) and burner adjustment valve—with ignition via either an outside source or integral push-button electric igniter, depending on the model.

The ring of corrugated metal forming the burner also shields it from wind and directs heat to the base of the pot. The ring and burner, along with a coiled heat exchanger at the bottom of the stove all work to contain heat, enabling an average boiling time of two minutes and fifteen seconds.

The company markets its fuel, a mixture of propane and isobutane, in canisters that thread to the bottom of the burner. Several stove models feature a stabilizing tripod (for the base of the fuel canister) as well as a plastic cup, which covers the heat exchanger during storage.

== Models ==
Jetboil has marketed a range of stoves that vary in construction materials and features, with more expensive models offering lighter weight and decreased cooking times:

- Personal Cooking System (2004) weight (425 grams), boil time: 4 minutes.
- Group Cooking System (2006), 1.6 liter pot, boil time: 5:00.
- Helios, group cooking system (2008–2014), replaced by Joule.
- Flash (2009), offered in different colours, boil time: 2.25 minutes.
- Zip (2011), 0.8 liter aluminum cup, adjustable burner, no ignitor, weight 9.5 ounces, boil time 2.5 minutes.
- Sol TI (2011) titanium cup, weight 5.3 ounces includes pressure regulator boil time: 1.75 minutes, lightest model.
- Sol Advanced (2011), aluminum cup, push-button igniter, weight 10.5 ounces, integral pressure regulator, boil time 2:00.
- Sumo Al (2012) aluminum cup, three bowls with lids, orange in color, reversible sleeve, self-storing.
- Sumo TI Group Cooking (2012) performs to 20 °F (−7 °C), boil time 4.25 minutes group cooking, titanium cup.
- Joule (2013), 2.5 liter pot, uses liquid-feed butane, stove base and pot, no accessories. weight 27.6 ounces.
- MiniMo (2014), 1 liter pot, flame control valve, weight 14.6 ounces.
- Flash 2.0 (2018). Boil time 1 minute 40 seconds.
- Flash 1.0L Fast Boil (2025), 1 liter pot, ceramic ignition case, turn-and-click ignition.

Accessories include a lightweight coffee press, replacement lids, mesh strainers, support and stabilizer kit, pots and pans, utensils and plastic plates, and a tool for puncturing holes in used fuel canisters prior to recycling.

== See also ==
- Johnson Outdoors
- Portable stove
