= Tim Niemier =

American designer of watercraft

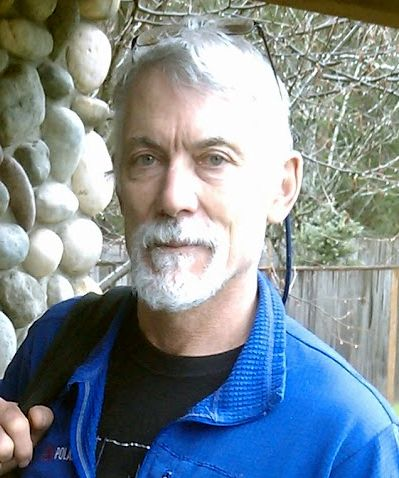
- Born: March 25, 1951; Malibu, California, U.S.
- Known for: Introducing sit-on-top kayak design

Tim Niemier is a designer of watercraft, currently focusing on kayaks and stand up paddleboards. Niemier is credited with introducing the sit-on-top (SOT) kayak design. “I sort of introduced those,” Niemier said of the sit-on-top design. “I didn't really invent it.”

In January 1988, Tim founded kayak manufacturing and sales company, Ocean Kayak, to produce these unique kayaks using polyethylene. Ocean Kayak was producing upwards of 200 kayaks per day when its assets were purchased in 1997 by Johnson Worldwide Associates, now Johnson Outdoors, Inc.

Since selling Ocean Kayak, Niemier has been providing custom design services and creating new lines of stand up paddleboards and other watercraft for manufacturers and individuals.

== Early life ==
Niemier grew up in Malibu, California and loved being out on the water in spite of his fear of it. His expertise with watercraft started early, spending much of his spare time as a youth paddling along the coast and out to dive sites. He learned about their design dynamics and began testing designs of his own.

In 1971, Niemier designed and produced his first kayak using fiberglass molding. While taking it to the beach to test he was asked how much it cost. Not expecting anyone to buy it, Niemier offered to sell it at three times his production cost. The price was accepted and, fresh out of high school, Niemier had sold his first kayak.

In the years following, Niemier set up shop in Malibu selling personally-designed kayaks to customers on a small stretch of beach near home. From this success, he realized the potential for much bigger sales volumes in larger markets.

== Ocean Kayak ==
After years of successful design and sales, Niemier launched Ocean Kayak in Ferndale, Washington in 1988. Adopting rotational molding as the preferred production process, enabled producing kayaks in far greater quantities than possible with fiberglass molds. This supported the success they were having in the marketplace.

In 1997, Johnson Worldwide Associates, Inc. (now Johnson Outdoors, Inc.), purchased the assets of Ocean Kayak. The terms of the purchase were not made public.

== Origami Paddler ==
Tim first designed and launched a foldable standup paddle board in 2012 called the Origami Paddler at the website Origamipaddler.com. This first version relied on a combination of a hinge and strap to fold and secure the board. Tim redesigned and relaunched the Origami Paddler using the same site domain in summer of 2020 on Kickstarter, which rapidly grew to become one of the top Kickstarter campaigns of all time, despite the global COVID-19 pandemic, with over 8,000 backers pledging over 3.8 million dollars. The new design can be used as a standup paddle board or kayak with three hollow plastic hulls connected by a unique modular hinge and locking system that allows the Origami Paddler to fold open and closed or be secured in "paddle mode". The Origami Paddler is suggested for use in flat, calm water with a capacity of 250 lbs. Its total weight is composed of three 15 pound hulls. Its dimensions allow it to be ground-shipped in the US and to fit in the trunk space of most compact cars. Tim has stated his goal to be environmentally responsible with plastic manufacturing, sources, and waste streams.

In July 2022, the company entered receivership due to unfulfilled orders and persistent manufacturing challenges, such as broken hinges and hull leakages from mold holes and seams. Additional complications emerged from issues with shipping, including disordered shipments and inadequate packaging. At the time, the company was led by CEO Tim Niemier and CFO Paul Hoyt. The strategic focus shifted towards the development of new designs and scaling operations, alongside an increase in monthly expenses intended to attract potential investors. These strategies involved significant investments in bulk inventory, escalating financial risks and contributing to the company's financial instability.

On July 15, 2022, the company entered receivership and came under the control of a court-appointed receiver. Subsequently, Origami Paddler was acquired by another company.

== Currently ==
Niemier now lives in Bellingham, Washington, where he continues to create new kayak and stand up paddleboard designs. He also offers business consulting services and speaking. Niemier's personal goal remains the same, “To put a billion butts in boats.”
