= Johnson Outdoors =

Producer of outdoor recreational products, with several brand names

- Traded as: Nasdaq: JOUT (Class A); Russell 2000 Component
- Revenue: ▼US$592 million (2025)
- Net income: ▼ −US$34.3 million (2025)

Johnson Outdoors Inc. (Nasdaq: JOUT) produces outdoor recreational products such as watercraft, diving equipment, camping gear, and outdoor clothing. It has operations in 24 locations worldwide, employs 1,400 people and reports sales of more than $315 million. Helen Johnson-Leipold, one of Samuel Curtis Johnson, Jr.'s four children, has run the company since 1999.

== Brands ==
=== Fishing - ===
- Humminbird
- Minn Kota
- Cannon

=== Diving - ===
- SCUBAPRO

=== Camping - ===
- Jetboil

=== Water Craft - ===
- Old Town

== Company history ==
The company, previously known as Johnson Wax Associates, grew out of diversification and acquisition efforts by S. C. Johnson & Son during the 1970s. It became a profitable, self-sustaining outdoor equipment business known as Johnson Camping, Inc., later renamed Johnson Worldwide Associates (JWA).

=== Silva Compass (discontinued) ===
From 1980, JWA imported Swedish-made compasses manufactured by Silva Production AB (Silva Group) for sale in North America. In 1996, a decision by Silva Production AB of the Silva Group parent to begin marketing its Swedish-made Silva brand compasses via a new distribution network in North America with Brunton, Inc. led to litigation the following year between JWA, which owned the North American Silva distribution network, and Silva Production AB, the Swedish manufacturer. As of 2008, JWA (now known as Johnson Outdoors, Inc.) was sourcing most of its Silva brand compasses from PT Uwatec Batam, an Indonesia-based wholly owned subsidiary of Johnson Outdoors, Inc. The discontinued Silva 424 Wrist Sighting Compass was made for Johnson Outdoors by Suunto Oy of Finland, while the Silva Lensatic 360 compass is made in Taiwan. JO ceased all distribution of Silva brand magnetic compasses in 2018.

In 2018, JO sold its North America rights to the Silva brand to Silva of Sweden AB.

=== Healthways ===
Healthways was a firm founded by Dick Klein which made scuba gear. It went bankrupt in 1963; its successor company is Scubapro.

It was one of the five original USA diving gear makers: U.S. Divers, Healthways, Voit, Dacor, Swimaster.

Healthways is notable in that it was the first manufacturer to use "scuba" as a word rather than an acronym. Their twin-hose regulator line was called the "Scuba"; hence, one of their later models, the Scuba Pro, eventually became the name of the reorganized company. (Healthways' single-hose regulators were dubbed the "Scubair" line.)

=== Scubapro ===
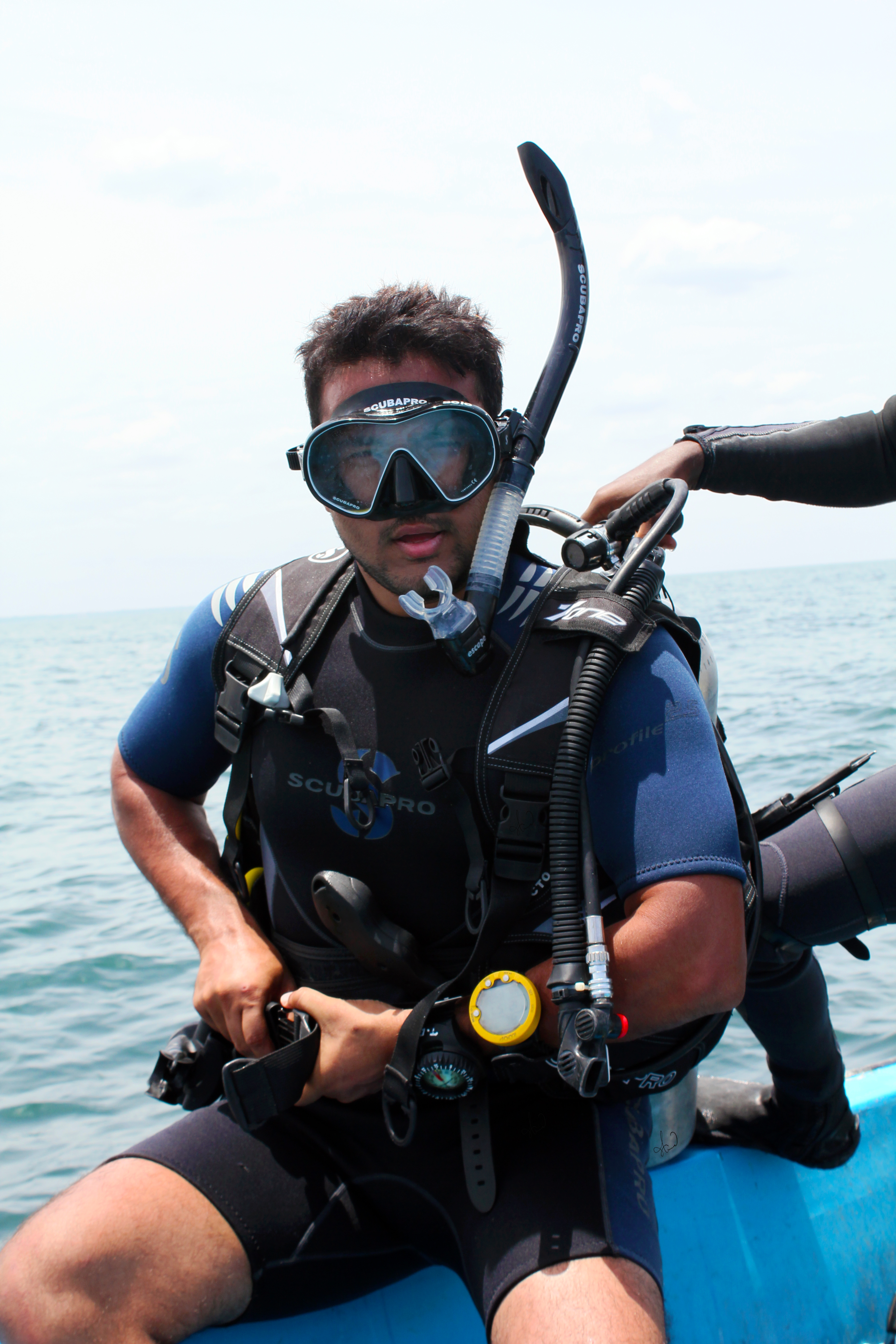
Diver wearing Scubapro dive suit and accessories

Scubapro was founded in the United States in 1963 by Gustav Dalla Valle, the Beuchat representative in United States, and Dick Bonin to manufacture scuba gear. Scubapro merged with dive computer manufacturer Uwatec in 1997 and became part of Johnson Outdoors. The company, now known as "Scubapro Uwatec", currently manufactures diving regulators, buoyancy compensators, dive computers, masks, fins, snorkels, wetsuits and drysuits, as well as scuba accessories.

SeemannSub, also known as Subgear, was acquired by Scubapro in 2007.

=== Uwatec ===
Uwatec was founded in Switzerland in 1984 as a manufacturer of scuba gear. In 1987, it introduced the Aladin PRO, establishing a reputation for making diving computers; however, multiple lawsuits accusing Uwatec (and later Johnson Outdoors) of a seven-year cover-up of a potentially lethal dive-computer bug tainted that reputation. Uwatec merged with Scubapro in 1997, becoming part of Johnson Outdoors.

=== Subgear ===
Subgear is the rebranded name of Seemann Sub, a diving brand active in Germany since 1979.

=== Jetboil ===
Since November 2012, Johnson Outdoors has owned Jetboil, a company that produces lightweight gas fueled portable stoves.

=== Eureka! ===
Johnson Outdoors acquired Eureka! Tent Company in 1973.

=== Old Town Canoe ===
Johnson Outdoors acquired Old Town Canoe from S. C. Johnson & Son in 2004; the latter acquired Old Town Canoe in 1974.

=== Ocean Kayak ===
Ocean Kayak was founded by Tim Niemier in 1988 to sell polyethylene sit-on-top kayaks. Johnson Outdoors acquired the company in 1997.
