= Brunton, Inc. =

American navigation tool manufacturer

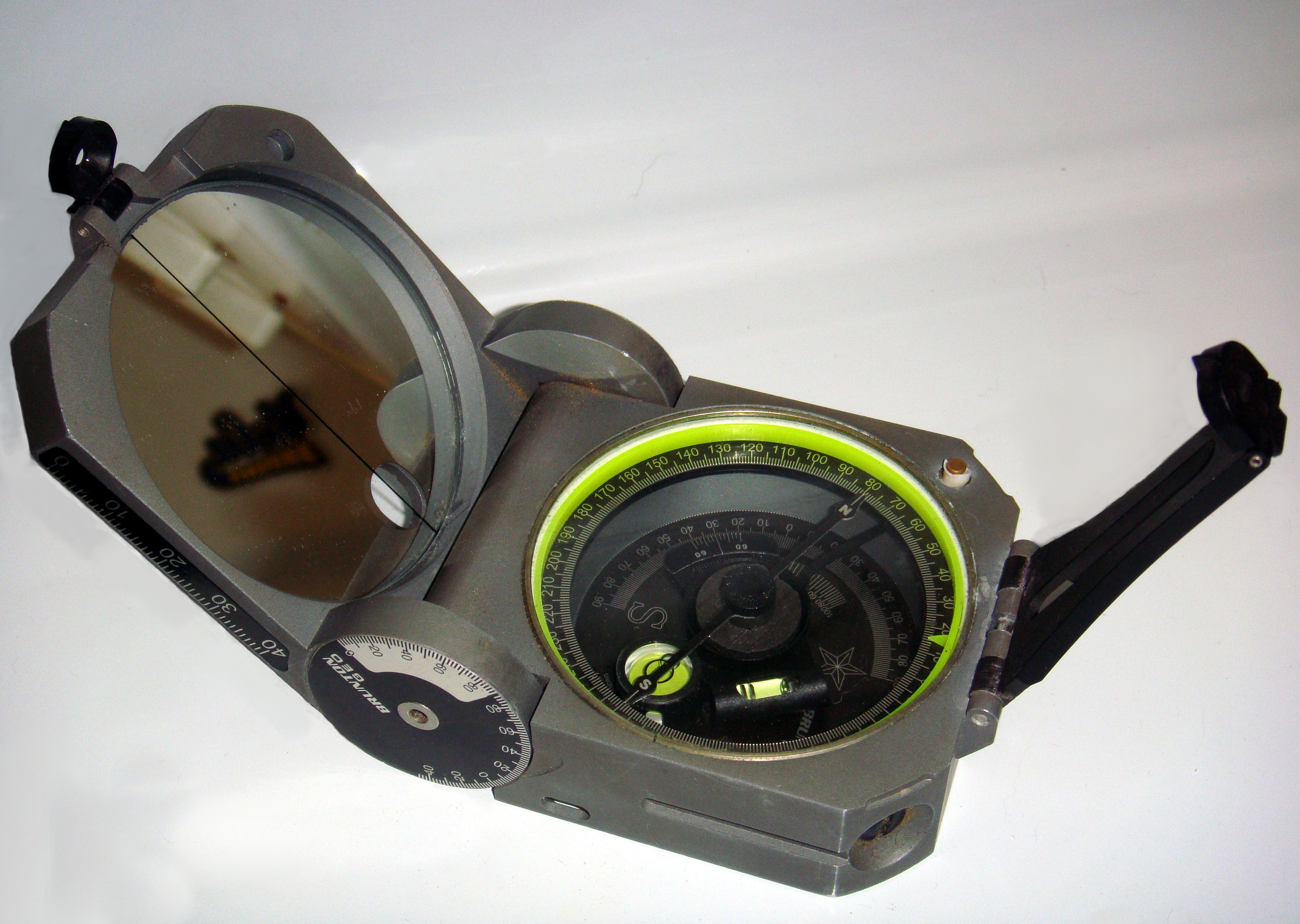
A standard Brunton Geo, used commonly by geologists

Brunton International LLC (formerly Brunton Inc.) is a manufacturer of navigation tools. Their product line includes recreational compasses, navigational equipment, and geology and survey instruments. They are located in Riverton, Wyoming.

== History ==
David W. Brunton, a Canadian-born geologist and mining engineer, and William Ainsworth, a skilled watch repairman, founded Brunton in 1895. The firm is most famous for its earliest product, the Brunton Pocket Transit. Geologists, foresters, surveyors, and archaeologists use this handheld compass and clinometer. Often simply called a "Brunton", the Pocket Transit was first patented in 1894 by David Brunton, who commissioned William Ainsworth & Sons to manufacture his invention in Denver, Colorado. The company later incorporated as William Ainsworth Inc. and for many years produced the Pocket Transit along with surveying transits, theodolites, and other instruments.

By 1965, William Ainsworth Inc. was owned by a series of corporate conglomerates, and product quality varied as the company changed hands repeatedly. In 1972, a group of businessmen from Riverton, Wyoming bought the company and formed Brunton, Inc. In Riverton, Brunton began producing a new series of recreational outdoor compasses, hunting knives, and binoculars in addition to the Brunton Pocket Transit.

In 1996, the company was acquired by Silva of Sweden AB, the original Swedish-based manufacturer of the Silva brand compass. Initially, Brunton sold Silva of Sweden compasses and GPS devices imported from Sweden under the Elite Pro Elite, Nexus, and MNS labels (Johnson Outdoors retained the exclusive rights to the Silva brand name in North America). Brunton began sourcing some of its compass models from Asia.

In 2006, the Silva Group was acquired by the Finnish Fiskars Corporation. Along with the rest of the Silva Group, Brunton became part of the Outdoor division of Fiskars. As of 2009, Brunton, Inc. employed about 40 people.

In December 2009, Fiskars announced the sale of Brunton Inc. to Fenix Outdoor AB, a Swedish company. As a result of Fiskars divestment of Brunton Inc., Silva of Sweden AB ceased all exports of its Swedish-made compasses and GPS devices to North America, including the Nexus, Elite, and Pro Elite lines. In turn, Brunton ceased export of its model 8020, 8040, and 9020 compasses to Silva of Sweden AB.

As of 2012, the company employed around 68 people at its Riverton, Wyoming manufacturing facility.

== Product range ==
=== Magnetic compasses ===
As William Ainsworth Inc., production of the Pocket Transit continued; the same basic design remains in production today, in numerous versions and configurations.

In 1970, the company introduced the Brunton Cadet, a simplified evolution of the Pocket Transit incorporating a compass and clinometer, intended for use in training students in the fields of geology, forestry, mining, and surveying. The company soon began marketing the Cadet to instruct Boy Scouts in the principles of surveying.

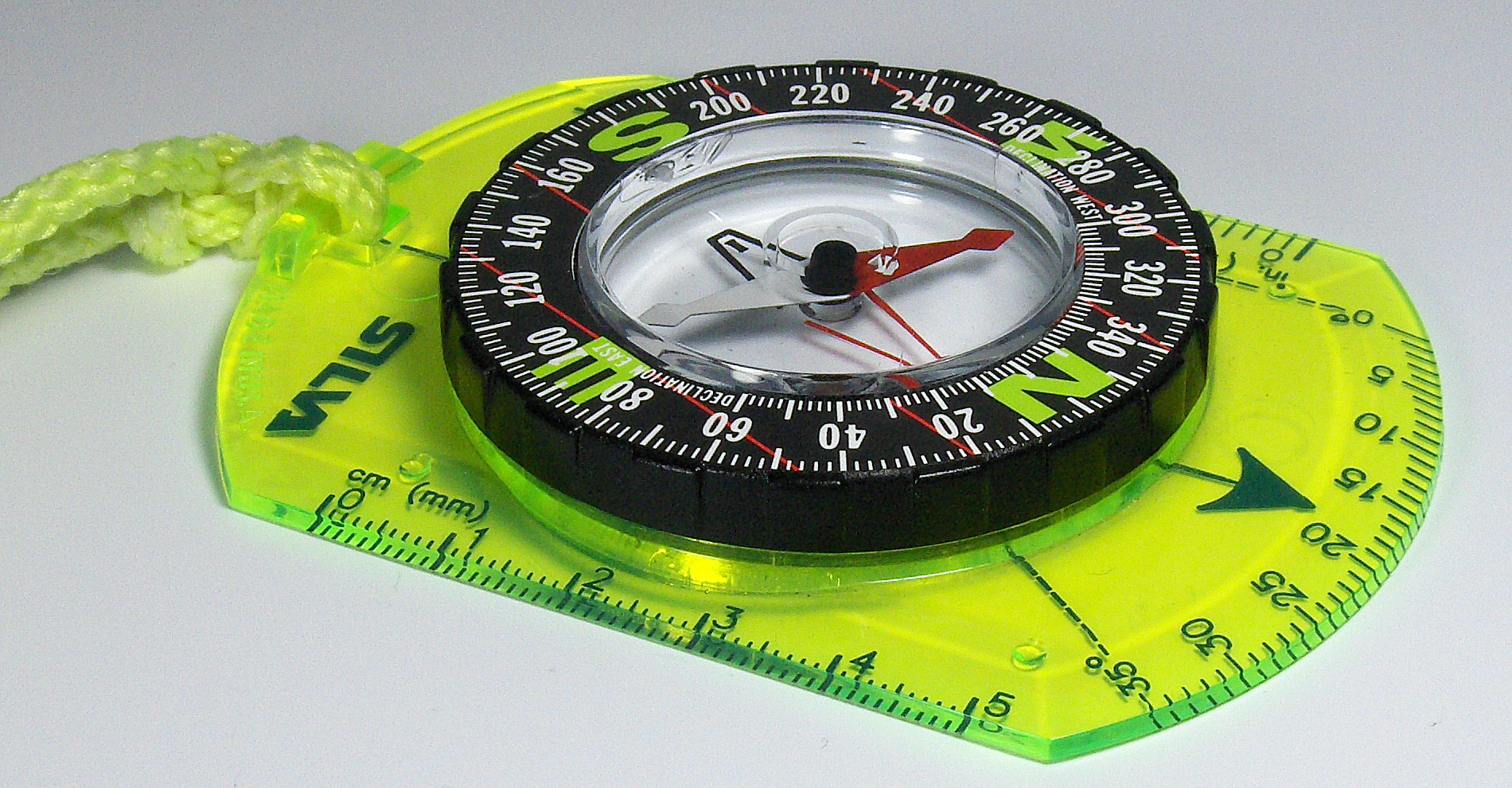
A Brunton 9020G/Silva Voyager compass

In 1972, the newly formed Brunton, Inc. began compass and transit production in Riverton, Wyoming. Compasses included the Pocket Transit, Cadet, and an emergency compass called the Life Card, designed to float in a bowl of water. This was followed in 1981 by the Model 8040 Sportsman's Compass, a map (baseplate) compass with folding cover and mirror sight. In the same year, Brunton introduced the Model 9020. This small baseplate compass was designed for hikers, outdoorsmen, and hunters.

Over the next ten years, Brunton would introduce a full range of map or baseplate compasses based on a liquid-filled vial with no-tools adjustment for magnetic declination. This new line included Models 8010, 8020, 8040, 9020, and the compact 9030 Trailbuster. Brunton baseplate compasses with a G suffix (i.e. 9020G) featured bright 'optic green' acrylic baseplates combined with a 'deep well' capsule and top-hat mount needle pivot in order to function in most magnetic zones. Brunton often included UTM and map scales with these compasses for U.S. standard 1:24,000 and 1:62,500 USGS topographic maps. The Model 9030 Trailbuster was intended to replicate the popular Boy Scout Trailblazer pocket compass discontinued by Taylor Instrument Co. The 9030 omitted the usual acrylic baseplate in order to minimize bulk (it weighed only 1 ounce), yet could still be adjusted to hold a set course or take bearings from a map.

In 1991, the U.S. military purchased a number of Brunton Model 8010 Smoke Chaser compasses originally produced for U.S. Forest Service fire-fighting crews. Assigned an NSN stock number, the compasses were stocked in survival kits for U.S. Navy and Marine flight crews. These Model 8010 compasses used clear baseplates and were equipped with lanyards. The compasses were shipped in plain cardboard boxes with military stock number NSN 6605-00-553-8795. Brunton discontinued all 8000- and 9000- series compasses in 2011.

After being acquired by Silva, Brunton began selling Silva of Sweden compasses and GPS devices. The Brunton 'Nexus' line included the Silva Model 15T and Model 25 Ranger compasses, rebranded as the Nexus 15TDC/TDCLE and 25TDC/TDCLE (Nexus 225) Pro Elite. The 25TDCL and 25TDCLE Pro Elite a.k.a. Nexus Type 225 compasses remain, technologically speaking, the high-water mark of the Silva of Sweden 'Ranger' design. Another advanced Silva design sold by Brunton was the Model 54LU (Silva Expedition 54), a sophisticated prismatic baseplate compass marketed to foresters, surveyors, geologists, and SAR teams. Silva of Sweden in turn imported some Brunton designs to be marketed in Europe under the Voyager name. Brunton at this time began importing some of their compass line from Taiwan, including the Models 9030 Trailbuster, and the 9075 and 9077 lensatic compasses.

In 1997, Brunton introduced an electronic fluxgate compass called the Brunton Outback. Imported from Taiwan, the Outback featured gimbal-mounted magnetic sensors. Brunton claimed that the Outback could be tilted in use up to 15 degrees while producing accurate readings. Storing up to 10 bearings in its memory, the Outback also featured a night navigation mode with illuminated arrows to warn the user if he walked off-course. The Outback was criticized for poor rain resistance and short overall battery life, and was eventually replaced by the Brunton Nomad electronic compass, which was produced in two versions. Poor sales caused Brunton to discontinue the Nomad in 2011.

In 1998, Brunton introduced its Eclipse range of imported liquid-filled baseplate compasses featuring low-profile vials, a magnified readout in 1-degree increments, and an unconventional, patented circle-over-circle magnetized disk in place of a traditional pointed needle, set into an extremely shallow liquid-filled capsule. The Eclipse compasses included the Model 8096 GPS, the Model 8097, and the Model 8099 Pro. Like older Brunton outdoor compasses, the Eclipse series used no-tools adjustable declination. Designed by Brunton, but imported from China, some owners of Eclipse compasses reported issues with air bubbles forming in the compass vials as well as parallax issues when using the sighting mechanism. The shallow capsule depth also limited the compass' ability to point accurately to north in varying magnetic zones.

In 2009, Brunton stopped selling most Silva of Sweden products. The Nexus and Elite lines were discontinued, as well as the Brunton 54LU. Some Silva models, including the Brunton 15TDCL and Brunton 16DLU, were later sourced from a production facility in China. In 2011, Brunton discontinued the Models 8010G, 8020, 8040G, 9020G, and 9030 compasses.

In 2012, Brunton introduced a new series of outdoor compasses called O.S.S. (Orbital Sighting System). Like the Eclipse series, the O.S.S. compasses featured double-thickness acrylic baseplates, a large liquid-filled capsule and a circle-over-circle north indicator. To answer criticisms of the previous Eclipse design, Brunton incorporated several design changes including a deep-well 'global' vial, a serrated outer bezel, and map meridian lines imprinted in the base of the housing (to aid in map orientation). Unlike older Eclipse compasses, O.S.S. compasses were assembled in Riverton, Wyoming from components made in the United States. As of 2012, Brunton was the only major compass manufacturer with U.S.-based production facilities.

In 2014, Brunton dropped the circle-over-circle magnetized disk/needle design used in the Eclipse and O.S.S. series, and returned to a traditional needle design for the magnetic north indicator. The current TruArc baseplate compass line uses rare-earth magnets to stabilize the north indicator needle. Equipped with 'deep-well' liquid-filled capsules, all TruArc compasses were designed from the outset to work in all magnetic zones.

In 2016 Brunton introduced the Axis Pocket Transit (F-5011 and F-5012) intended specifically for geologists. The Axis Pocket Transit offered for the first time simultaneous measurements of strike, dip, trend, and plunge in a variety of configurations. The Axis Pocket Transit features an unconventional lid design that swings a full 360 degrees in both directions and two axes that allow precise measurement of vertical and horizontal angles on all configurations of bedding surfaces. It also breaks from traditional transit functionality in orienting north in-line with the major axis and in sighting through this hinge without the standard mirror and sight arm.

Brunton launched a new series of illuminated field survey instruments and general outdoors (baseplate-style) compasses at the OutDoor show in Friedrichshafen, Germany, June 18, 2017. The Omnisight LED is a lensatic (direct-sighting) surveying compass reminiscent of the previous Brunton Clinomaster, but with LED illumination. The compass is also available with a built-in clinometer as the Omnislope LED. Brunton introduced new photoluminescent dials to its TruArc line of compasses, and reintroduced the older Brunton 8010 (Smoke Chaser) compass with clear baseplate, now incorporating a new photoluminescent dial marked in degrees. A version using an MRAD (mils) scale has since been discontinued.

=== GPS receivers ===
In 2000, Silva of Sweden AB introduced its Silva Multi-Navigator GPS device. Brunton marketed the product in North America as the Brunton MNS. The MNS featured an electronic compass, barometer, and barometric altimeter in addition to GPS functionality. With a relatively high energy consumption of 210 mA (or 270 mA with illumination on), the MNS had a battery life of around 10 hours. At $399, the Brunton MNS faced intense competition competitors such as Garmin and Magellan. Products with better battery life and improved scrolling menu displays kep the MNS from gaining significant market share. Furthermore, the MNS was not WAAS capable and did not offer internal storage of waypoints, routes or tracks. In 2004, Brunton introduced a lower-priced GPS receiver, the ATLAS, a rebadged version of the Lowrance iFinder. This product also failed to gain a significant share of the handheld GPS market, and Brunton discontinued all handheld GPS receivers in 2009.

=== Optics ===
In 1992, Brunton introduced a line of binoculars and other optical equipment aimed at the hunting and outdoor recreation market. The optics line was discontinued in 2014.

== See also ==
- Brunton compass
