= Silva compass =

Swedish navigation tool manufacturer

Silva Sweden AB
- Founded: Sweden
- Founders: Gunnar Tillander, Alvar Kjellström, Arvid Kjellström, and Björn Kjellström
- Products: Compasses
- Brands: Nexus, Brunton
- Parent: Fiskars
- Website: silvasweden.com

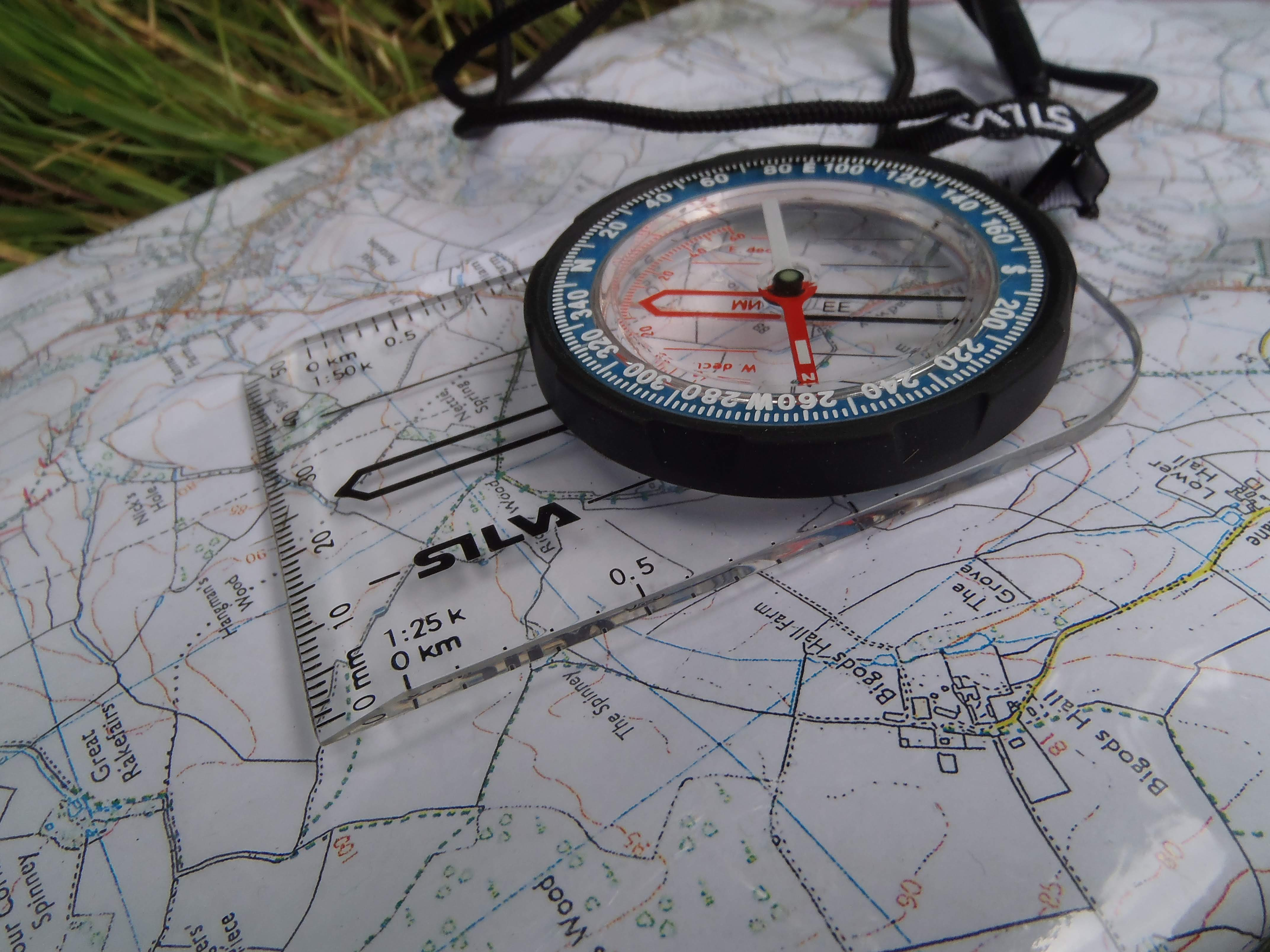
Silva Field baseplate compass on a map

Silva Sweden AB is an outdoors products company that sells handheld compasses and other navigational equipment including GPS tools, mapping software, aircraft altimeters, and marine navigation tools. Silva's founders - Gunnar Tillander, Alvar Kjellström, Arvid Kjellström, and Björn Kjellström - invented the hugely popular orienteering baseplate or protractor compass used around the world for outdoors navigation.

Created in Sweden, the company exports worldwide, with marketing companies in Stockholm, Sweden; Mantes-la-Ville, France; Friedrichsdorf, Germany; and Livingston, Scotland. Silva compasses are produced for Silva by the HANZA Group in Suzhou, China.

== History ==
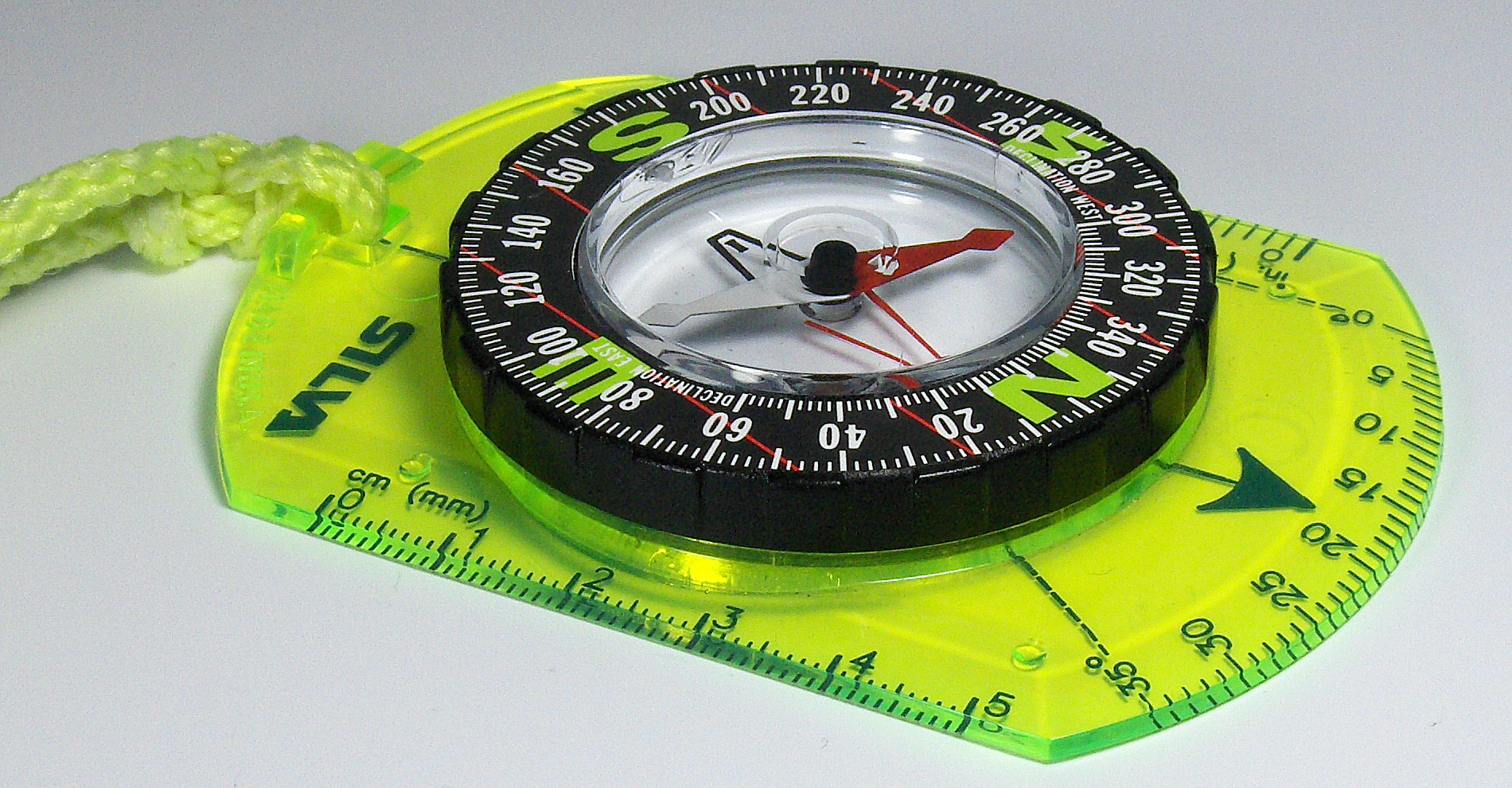
Silva Voyager compass (Brunton 9020)

Silva Sweden AB created their first compass in 1928, and established their company in 1933.
Below is a chronological timeline of important dates in the history of Silva Sweden AB:

- 1928 Gunnar Tillander invents the first orienteering (baseplate) compass.
- 1932 The Silva Company is established in December 1932 by Tillander, Alvar Kjellström, Arvid Kjellström, and Björn Kjellström. The company introduces its first baseplate compass with a liquid-damped capsule.
- 1938 First Silva marine compass introduced with liquid damping.
- 1939 Silva Armékompass Model 1939 first Silva compass with mirror-sight introduced, with liquid-damped capsule.
- 1946 Björn Kjellström begins U.S. Silva operations as The Silva Company (later Silva, Inc.). Compass assembly factory established in La Porte, Indiana to manufacture induction-damped (dry capsule) compasses for the North American market. La Porte IN Silva Orienteering Services established to support the sport of orienteering in North America.
- 1948 Kjellström founds Silva's Canadian distributor operations in Toronto, Canada as Silva Ltd.
- 1950 Silva The Ranger orienteering sighting compass introduced to North America featuring a mirror sighting system and liquid-damped needle.
- 1958 Silva Production AB expands with new plastics manufacturing operations
- 1960 Silva Production AB expands with new tooling and manufacturing operations. Silva introduces its first wrist compass, featuring a mechanical needle dampener.
- 1964 Silva Ranger Type 15 deluxe compass introduced with optional adjustable declination, clinometer, and quadrant scale
- 1973 New manufacturing plant, Instrumentverken in Sollentuna. Johnson Wax Associates (JWA) acquires Silva, Inc. (Silva USA).
- 1980 JWA moves its corporate headquarters to Binghamton, New York, closing the Silva USA compass factory in La Porte, Indiana. Type 50 Hand Bearing compass introduced for small boat owners.
- 1981 Silva Production AB launches its first electronic instrument design
- 1981 Acquisition of different lines of sporting goods for Swedish sport market by Silva Production AB.
- 1982 Production of first electronic instruments by Silva Production AB.
- 1985 Johnson Worldwide Associates (JWA) purchases Silva Ltd. of Canada.
- 1986 Enlargement of Silva Production AB manufacturing plant in Sollentuna.
- 1989 Launching of largest investment program ever for The Silva Group. Market - production - research & development.
- 1990 Inauguration new premises Silva France. 25 million compasses produced. Acquisition of precision instrument producer Sisteco of Finland
- 1992 Silva Group introduces a GPS receiver with an integrated digital compass
- 1995 Björn Kjellström dies. The Silva factory in Haninge is reinaugurated.
- 1996 Silva Production AB acquires Brunton, Inc. and terminates its compass distribution agreement with Silva USA/JWA. Type 25 Ranger Pro compass introduced.
- 1997 JWA (later Johnson Outdoors, Inc.) files suit to retain exclusive rights to the Silva brand name in North America.
- 1998 Pursuant to a settlement agreement with JWA, Silva Production AB of Sweden agrees not to market compasses under the Silva brand in the USA and Canada. Silva of Sweden AB signs agreement with Brunton, Inc. to distribute its original Silva Swedish-made compasses under the Brunton and Nexus labels in North America. In turn, Brunton-designed compasses such as the Brunton 9020, 8040, and Eclipse and sourced from the U.S. and China are labeled with the Silva or Silva Voyager brand for sale in areas outside North America.
- 2000 Silva introduces the Silva Multi-Navigator a combined GPS, electronic compass, and barometric altimeter, sold as the Brunton MNS in North America.
- 2002 Silva opens a production facility in mainland China as a joint venture for production of some Silva compass models.
- 2005 Haninge, Sweden production facility closes. Silva acquires 100% ownership of the Shenzhen, China production facility.
- 2006 Fiskars AB acquires Silva Production AB Group of Sweden
- 2009 Fiskars sells Brunton Inc. to Fenix Outdoor AB of Sweden. Silva of Sweden stops exporting its compasses and GPS devices to North America under the Nexus and Brunton brands, and halts further imports of Brunton products to Europe under the Silva name.
- 2011 Fiskars sells Silva Sweden AB to Karnell, a Swedish investment firm. Silva ceases all compass production in Sweden.
- 2012 Silva Shenzhen becomes sole production facility for Silva compasses.
- 2016 After expiration of the Recta AG/Suunto Oy Turbo-20 global needle patent, Silva Sweden AB introduces its first global needle compasses.
- 2018 Silva Sweden AB reacquires North American distribution rights to the Silva brand from Johnson Outdoors. Silva discontinues all compass production at the Shenzhen facility and outsources future compass manufacturing to the HANZA Group in Suzhou, China

=== North American trademark dispute ===
After the founding of Silva USA in 1946 and Silva Ltd. in Canada two years later, both affiliates were later acquired by Johnson Wax Associates, later Johnson Camping, Inc., and by 1985, Johnson Worldwide Associates (JWA). From 1980, JWA had imported Swedish-made compasses manufactured by Silva Production AB for sale in North America.

In 1996, a decision by Silva Production AB to end sole distribution of its Swedish-made Silva-brand compasses by Silva USA led to a court battle the following year between JWA and Silva Production AB (Silva Sweden AB).

In 1998, JWA and Silva Production AB of Sweden reached a settlement whereby JWA retained the exclusive right to sell compasses under its Silva trademark in North America, made by unnamed manufacturers. JWA also retained the North American rights to some product names such as Ranger, Polaris, 1, 2, 3 and others commonly used and recognized in the U.S. and Canadian markets and made popular during the time Silva Production AB was manufacturing Swedish-made Silva compasses for JWA in North America. JWA was eventually renamed Johnson Outdoors, Inc.

For its part, Silva Production AB/Silva Group retained the right to manufacture and sell compasses, GPS tools, and other navigational products under its Silva trademark outside the United States and Canada, as well as market its Swedish-made compasses and GPS tools in North America under the Brunton, Elite, and Nexus brands. The Swedish firm also retained the right to state on Nexus packaging and in the Nexus catalog that Nexus compasses were made by Silva Production AB, but did not retain the right to advertise this fact. In 2006, the Fiskars Corp acquired the Silva Group, which included Brunton.

In 2009 Fiskars sold Brunton Inc. to Fenix Outdoor AB of Sweden, and in consequence, Silva Production AB stopped exporting Silva of Sweden compasses to North America under the Brunton and Nexus brands, and halted further imports of Brunton products to markets outside North America under the Silva brand. From 1998-2018, Silva of Sweden AB could not distribute its compass products to the USA or Canadian markets.

In 2018, Silva Sweden AB reacquired the U.S. and Canada distribution rights to the Silva brand from Johnson Outdoors.

== Current activity ==
In 2006, Silva was acquired by the Finnish Fiskars Group. Silva Sweden AB retained its own corporate identity as an outdoor products manufacturer within Fiskars under its Gerber Legendary Blades Division.

In 2009, Fiskars sold Brunton Inc. to a Swedish company, Fenix Outdoor AB. After divestiture, Brunton closed out its Nexus and Elite compass lines and discontinued the Brunton 54LU compass, all of which were relabeled Silva of Sweden products, and discontinued imports of the Silva Multi-Navigator GPS sold in North America as the Brunton MNS. These actions left Silva of Sweden without a North American distributor for its Swedish-made compasses and GPS tools. Fiskars sold Silva of Sweden to Karnell AB in 2011.

In 2018, Silva Sweden AB reacquired the North American distribution rights to the Silva brand from Johnson Outdoors. In March 2018, Silva Sweden AB announced it would outsource all compass production from its factory in China to the HANZA Group's production facilities in Suzhou, China

Today, the Silva Group consists of the parent company, now called Silva Sweden AB, together with its subsidiaries Silva Ltd. in the United Kingdom, Silva France, Silva Deutschland, and Silva Far East. The core activities of the Silva Group consist of design, development, manufacture of compasses for land and sea and sales of compasses, GPS and outdoor instruments, headlamps, binoculars and other electronic navigation equipment.

== Silva range ==
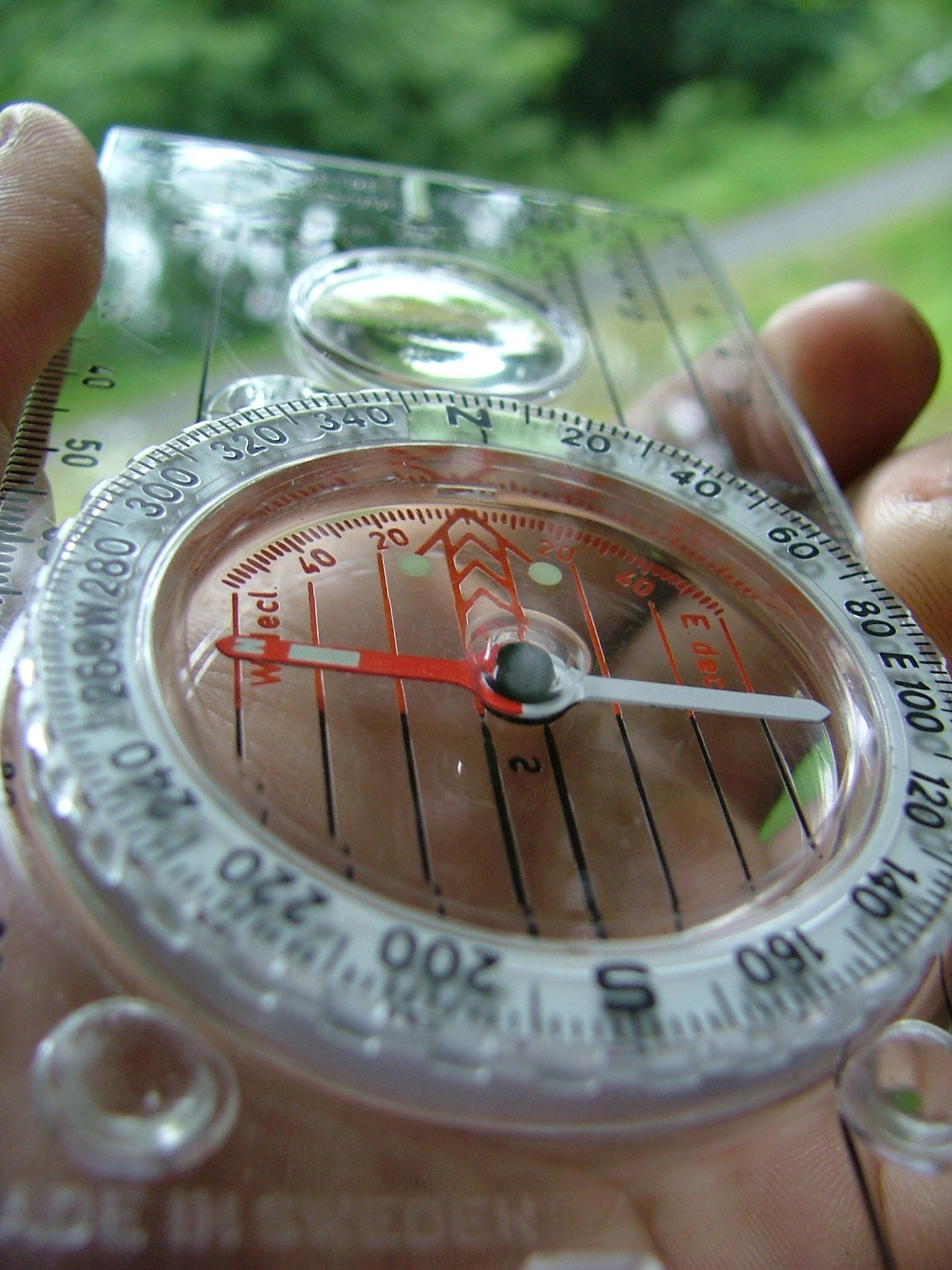
Silva Expedition 4 compass

=== Compasses ===
Silva of Sweden AB has manufactured a wide variety of portable compasses for recreational, hiking, scientific, and marine uses over the years, including simple protractor or baseplate compasses like the Field, Expedition 3 (formerly the Ranger 3), and Expedition 4 to more sophisticated sighting compasses such as the Expedition Model 54 and the Silva SightMaster line of surveying compasses.

Silva's Expedition 15T, Expedition TDCL, and Expedition S are modernized versions of the original Type 15 Silva Ranger, itself a development of the Model 1939 that incorporated a liquid-damped capsule with a sighting mirror that doubled as a protective cover. In the mid-1990s, Silva introduced the Model 25TDCL and TDCLE Ranger compass, rebranded for North American sale as the (Brunton) Nexus 225 or 25TDCL/TDCLE Pro Elite. The 25TDCL and 25TDCLE Pro Elite or Nexus Type 225 remains, technologically speaking, the high-water mark of the Silva Ranger compass design; Silva of Sweden never made a more advanced or better-equipped Ranger, and has since discontinued the Type 25/Type 225 entirely.

In keeping with its origins as orienteering compass manufacturers, Silva also offers its Orienteering Series of Jet, Spectra, and Race models optimized for orienteering and adventure racing competition.

Silva has a long history of supplying variants of their general-use compasses to various military forces of the world, including the defence forces of the United Kingdom, Denmark, Australia, New Zealand, and Sweden. These include the Silva Expedition 3 Military, Expedition 4 Military, Expedition 4B Military, Expedition 15T, Expedition 15TDCL, and Expedition 54 Military NATO compasses with dials in both mils and degrees and optional tritium lighting (all standard models have luminous lighting; models with a 'B' (beta) suffix are fitted with self-illuminating tritium capsules).

== Current compass models ==
At the HANZA group production facility in mainland China, Silva of Sweden AB manufactures a wide variety of portable compasses for recreational, hiking, scientific, and marine uses, including the Ranger, Ranger S, Expedition, and 3NL-0360 models. There are also 'global' needle versions suitable for use in all magnetic zones of the world.

=== GPS ===
In 2000, Silva introduced the Silva Multi-Navigator navigation tool, which combined a GPS receiver with an electronic compass, barometer, and altimeter. The Multi-Navigator was sold in North America under the Brunton brand as the Brunton MNS. The Multi-Navigator was followed in 2004 by the Silva Atlas navigation tool which featured a greyscale map display. Both the Multi-Navigator and the Atlas failed to capture a significant portion of the highly competitive GPS market, and were withdrawn from the market in 2009.

=== Other instruments ===
Besides compasses and GPS tools, Silva manufactures several other types of outdoor gear and navigational equipment, including weather/altimeter/temperature/wind meters, headlamps, binoculars, and orienteering accessories.

== See also ==
- Brunton, Inc.
- Navigation
- Johnson Outdoors, Inc./Silva USA
- Suunto
