= Timeline of United States inventions (1890–1945) =

Chronological list of advancements

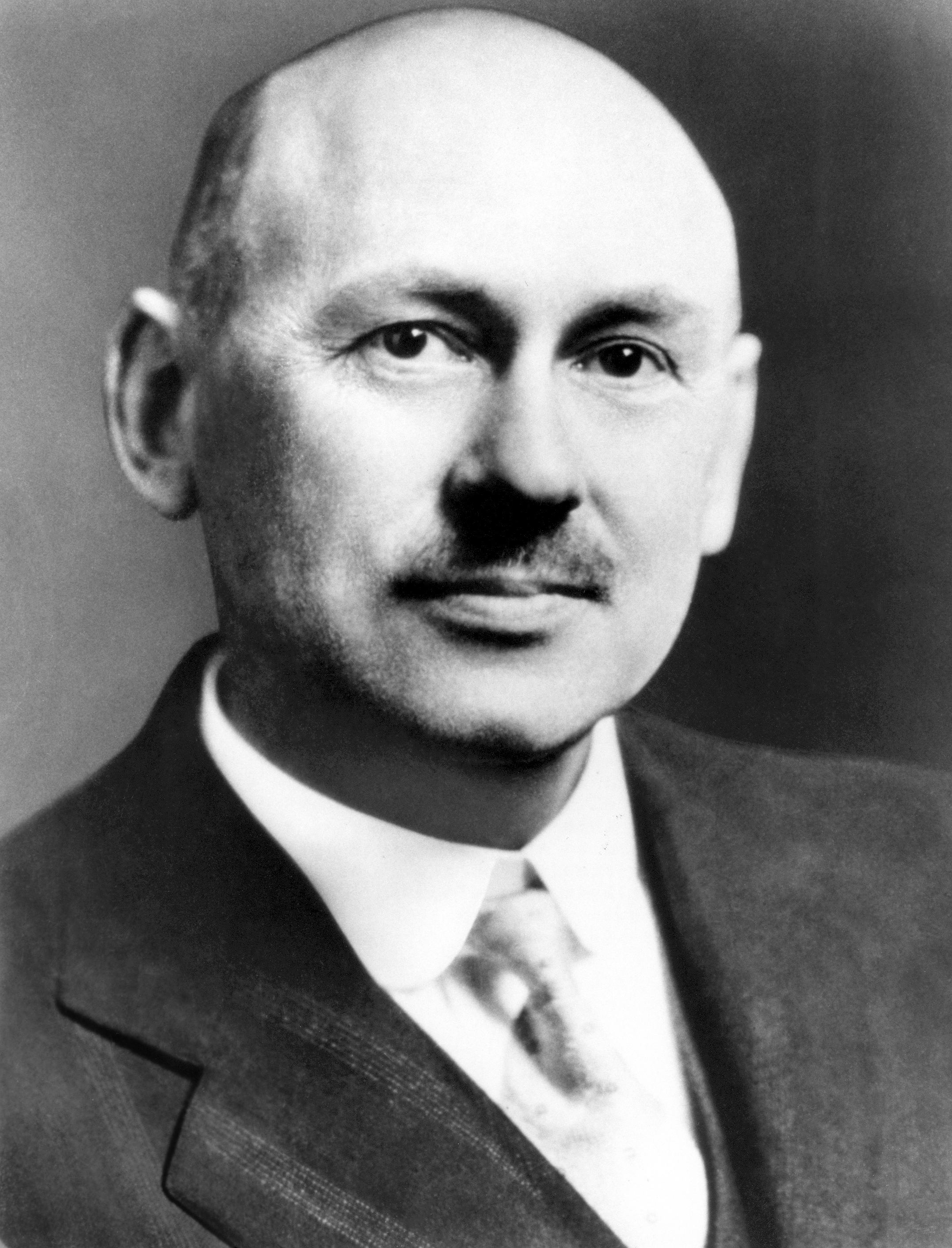
Robert H. Goddard (1882–1945), the American physicist and inventor who built and launched the world's first liquid-propellant rocket on March 16, 1926. Goddard held 214 patents for his inventions and pioneering innovations in liquid-propelled, guided, and multi-stage rockets.

A timeline of United States inventions (1890–1945) encompasses the innovative advancements of the United States within a historical context, dating from the Progressive Era to the end of World War II, which have been achieved by inventors who are either native-born or naturalized citizens of the United States. Copyright protection secures a person's right to the first-to-invent claim of the original invention in question, highlighted in Article I, Section 8, Clause 8 of the United States Constitution which gives the following enumerated power to the United States Congress:

To promote the Progress of Science and useful Arts, by securing for limited Times to Authors and Inventors the exclusive Right to their respective Writings and Discoveries.

In 1641, the first patent in North America was issued to Samuel Winslow by the General Court of Massachusetts for a new method of making salt. On April 10, 1790, President George Washington signed the Patent Act of 1790 (1 Stat. 109) into law which proclaimed that patents were to be authorized for "any useful art, manufacture, engine, machine, or device, or any improvement therein not before known or used." On July 31, 1790, Samuel Hopkins of Philadelphia, Pennsylvania, became the first person in the United States to file and to be granted a patent under the new U.S. patent statute. The Patent Act of 1836 (Ch. 357, 5 Stat. 117) further clarified United States patent law to the extent of establishing a patent office where patent applications are filed, processed, and granted, contingent upon the language and scope of the claimant's invention, for a patent term of 14 years with an extension of up to an additional seven years.

From 1836 to 2011, the United States Patent and Trademark Office (USPT) granted a total of 7,861,317 patents relating to several well-known inventions appearing throughout the timeline below. Some examples of patented inventions between the years 1890 and 1945 include John Froelich's tractor (1892), Ransom Eli Olds' assembly line (1901), Willis Carrier's air-conditioning (1902), the Wright Brothers' airplane (1903), and Robert H. Goddard's liquid-fuel rocket (1926).

== Progressive Era (1890–1919) ==
1890 Stop sign

- A stop sign is a traffic sign, usually erected at road junctions such as a four-way intersection, that instructs drivers to stop and then to proceed only if the way ahead is clear. The idea of placing stop signs at road junctions was first conceived in 1890 when William Phelps Eno of Saugatuck, Connecticut, proposed and devised the first set of traffic laws in an article published in Rider and Driver. However, the first use of stop signs did not appear until 1915 when officials in Detroit, Michigan, installed a stop sign with black letters on a white background. Throughout the years and with many alterations made to the stop sign, the current version with white block-lettering on a red background that is used in the United States as well as emulated in many other countries around the world today, did not come into use until the Joint Committee on Uniform Traffic Control Devices adopted the design in 1954.

1890 Tabulating machine

- The tabulating machine is an electrical device designed to assist in summarizing information and, later, accounting. The results of a tabulation are electrically coupled with a sorter while displayed on clock-like dials. The concept of automated data processing had been born. In 1890, Herman Hollerith invented the mechanical tabulating machine, a design used during the 1890 Census which stored and processed demographic and statistical information on punched cards.

1890 Shredded wheat

- Shredded wheat is a type of breakfast cereal made from whole wheat. Shredded wheat also comes in a frosted variety, which has one side coated with sugar and usually gelatin. Shredded wheat was invented in 1890 by Henry Perky of Watertown, New York.

1890 Babcock test

- The Babcock test was the first inexpensive and practical test which were used to determine the fat content of milk. Invented by Stephen Moulton Babcock in 1890, the test was developed to prevent dishonest farmers who could, until the 1890s, water down their milk or remove some cream before selling it to the factories because milk was paid by volume.

1890 Smoke detector

- A smoke detector is a device that detects smoke and issues a signal. Most smoke detectors work either by optical detection or by physical process, but some of them use both detection methods to increase sensitivity to smoke. Smoke detectors are usually powered by battery while some are connected directly to power mains, often having a battery as a power supply backup in case the mains power fails. The first automatic electric fire alarm was co-invented in 1890 by Francis Robbins Upton and Fernando J. Dibble. Upton and Dibble were issued U.S. patent #436,961. Upton was an associate of Thomas Alva Edison, although there is no evidence that Edison contributed to this invention.

1891 Incandescent lamp

- One of the most dramatic improvements occurred in artificial lighting. Thomas Edison's is credited with the first practical incandescent lamp which made lighting more practical for factories, offices, and homes, and transformed city life.

1891 Ferris wheel

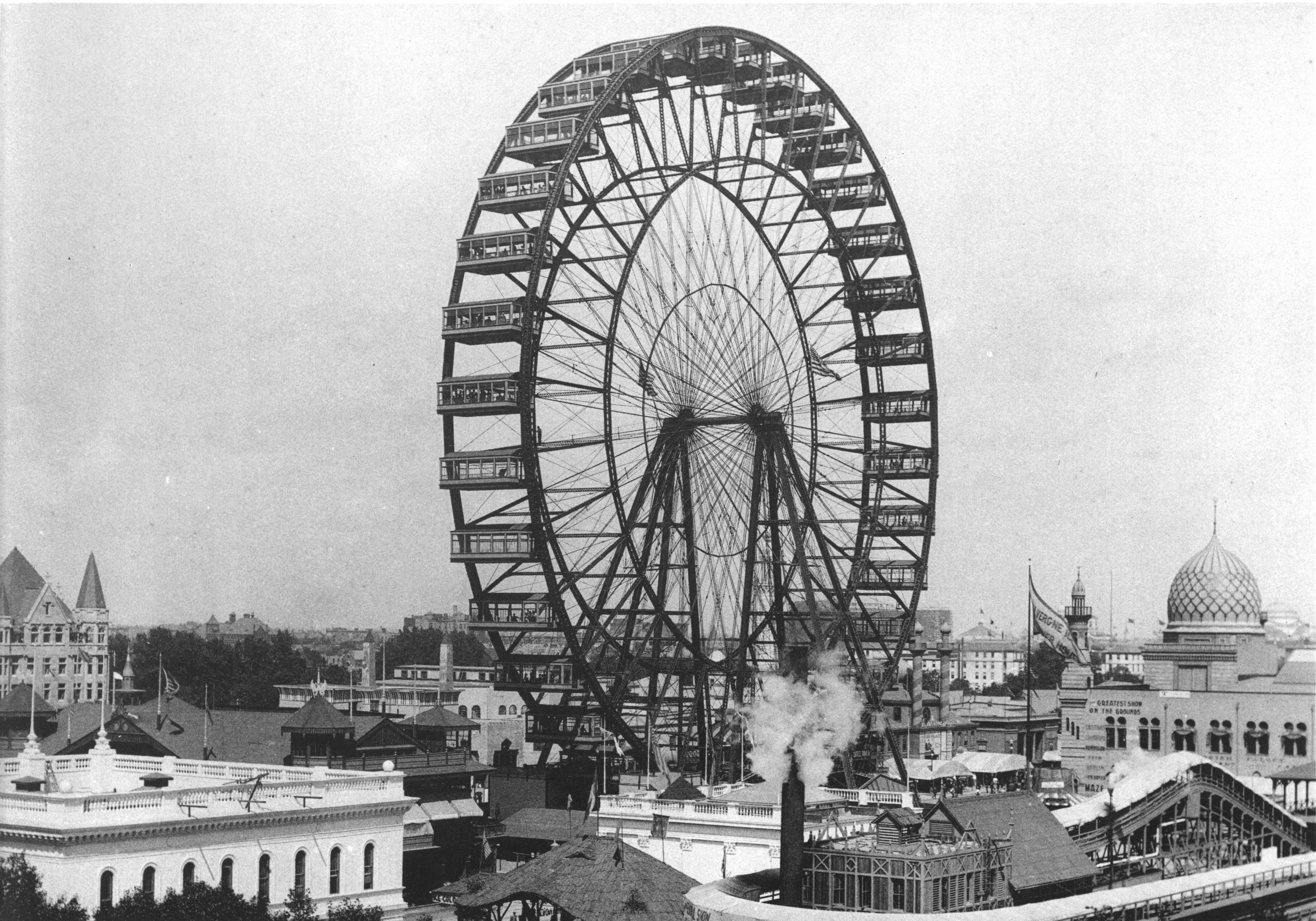
The original Ferris Wheel at the 1893 World's Columbian Exposition in Chicago

- A Ferris wheel is a non-building structure, consisting of an upright wheel with passenger gondolas attached to the rim. Opened on June 21, 1893, at the Chicago World's Fair, the original Ferris wheel was invented two years earlier by the Pittsburgh bridge-builder George Washington Gale Ferris Jr. in 1891.

1891 Dow process

- The Dow process is the electrolytic method of bromine extraction from brine, and was Herbert Henry Dow's second revolutionary process for generating bromine commercially in 1891.

1891 Tesla coil

- A Tesla coil is a type of resonant transformer circuit invented by Nikola Tesla around 1891. Nikola Tesla used these coils to conduct innovative experiments in electrical lighting, phosphorescence, x-ray generation, high frequency alternating current phenomena, electrotherapy, and the transmission of electrical energy without wires for point-to-point telecommunications, broadcasting, and the transmission of electrical power.

1891 Rotary dial

- The rotary dial is a device mounted on or in a telephone or switchboard that is designed to send electrical pulses, known as pulse dialing, corresponding to the number dialed. The early form of the rotary dial used lugs on a finger plate instead of holes. The rotary dial was invented by Almon Brown Strowger in 1891. Strowger filed U.S. patent#486,909 on December 21, 1891, that was later issued on November 29, 1892.

1891 Pastry fork

- A pastry fork, also known as a "pie fork", is a fork designed for eating pastries and other desserts while holding a plate. The fork has 3 or 4 tines. The 3 tine fork has a larger, flattened and beveled tine on the side while the 4 tine fork has the 1st and 2nd tine connected or bridged together and beveled. On July 7, 1891, Anna M. Mangin of Queens, a borough of New York City, filed the first patent for the pastry fork. U.S. patent #470,005 was later issued on March 1, 1892.

1891 Schrader valve

- A Schrader valve consists of a hollow cylindrical metal tube, typically brass, with the exterior end threaded. The interior end takes a variety of forms depending on its application. In the center of the exterior end is a metal pin pointing along the axis of the tube; the pin's end is flush with the end of the valve body. Generally, all Schrader valves are used on tires. They have threads and bodies of a single standard size at the exterior end, so caps and tools generally are universal for the valves on all automobile and bicycle pneumatic tires. Also, pressure valves can be used on Schrader valves in place of caps in order to measure the pressure of pneumatic tires. In 1891, George Schrader, the son of German-American immigrant August Schrader, invented the Schrader valve. A patent was issued on April 11, 1893.

1892 Bottle cap

- Bottle caps, or closures, are used to seal the openings of bottles of many types. They can be small circular pieces of metal, usually steel, with plastic backings, and for plastic bottles a plastic cap is used instead. Caps can also be plastic, sometimes with a pour spout. Flip-Top caps like Flapper closures provide controlled dispensing of dry products. The crown cork, the first form of a bottle cap, possessed flanges bent over a sealed bottle to compress the liquid inside. It was invented and patented in 1892 by William Painter of Baltimore, Maryland.

1892 Dimmer

- Dimmers are devices used to vary the brightness of a light. By decreasing or increasing the RMS voltage and hence the mean power to the lamp it is possible to vary the intensity of the light output. Although variable-voltage devices are used for various purposes, a dimmer is specifically those devices intended to control lighting. Dimmers are popularly used in venues such as movie theatres, stages, dining rooms, restaurants, and auditoriums where the need or absence of light during activities requires constant change. The dimmer was invented in 1892 by Granville Woods.

1892 Bicycle seat (padded)

- A bicycle seat, unlike a bicycle saddle, is designed to support the rider's buttocks and back, usually in a semi-reclined position. First known as the "Garford Saddle", the padded bicycle seat was invented in 1892 by Arthur Lovett Garford of Elyria, Ohio.

1892 internal combustion-powered tractor

- A tractor is a distinctive farm vehicle specifically designed to deliver a high tractive effort at slow speeds, for the purposes of hauling a trailer or machinery used in agriculture or construction. Agricultural implements may be towed behind or mounted on the tractor, and the tractor may also provide a source of power if the implement is mechanized. While steam powered tractors had been built earlier, In 1892, John Froelich invented and built the first gasoline-powered tractor in Clayton County, Iowa.

1893 Zipper

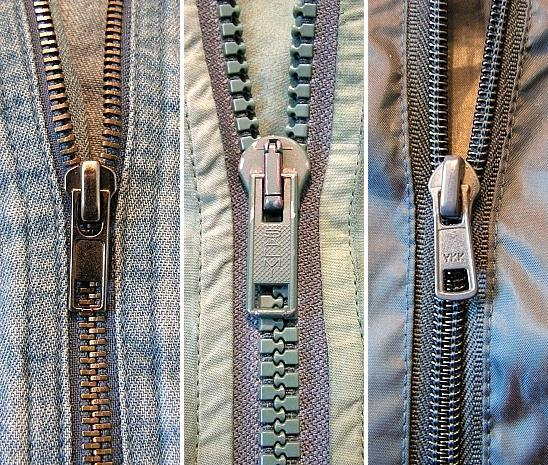
Three zippers: metal, plastic, and nylon

- The zipper is a popular device for temporarily joining two edges of fabric. Zippers are found on trousers, jeans, jackets, and luggage. Whitcomb L. Judson was an American mechanical engineer from Chicago who was the first to invent, conceive of the idea, and to construct a workable zipper. Using a hook-and-eye device, Judson intended for this earliest form of the zipper to be used on shoes. He also conceived the idea of the slide fastener mechanism in conjunction with the invention of the zipper. Patents were issued to Judson for the zipper in 1891, 1894, and 1905.

1893 Spectroheliograph

- The spectroheliograph is an instrument used in astronomy that captures a photographic image of the Sun at a single wavelength of light, a monochromatic image. The spectroheliograph was invented in 1893 by George Ellery Hale and independently later by Henri Alexandre Deslandres in 1894.

1893 Pinking shears

- Pinking shears are a type of scissors that have blades of which are sawtoothed instead of straight. Used to cut woven cloth, pinking shears leave a zigzag pattern instead of a straight edge. The earliest patent for pinking shears was U.S. patent #489,406 which was issued to Louise Austin of Whatcomb, Washington, on January 3, 1893.

Early 1890s Phantoscope

- A film projection machine created by Charles Francis Jenkins in the early 1890s. Jenkin's machine was the first projector to allow each still frame of the film to be illuminated long enough before advancing to the next frame sequence.

1894 Stadimeter

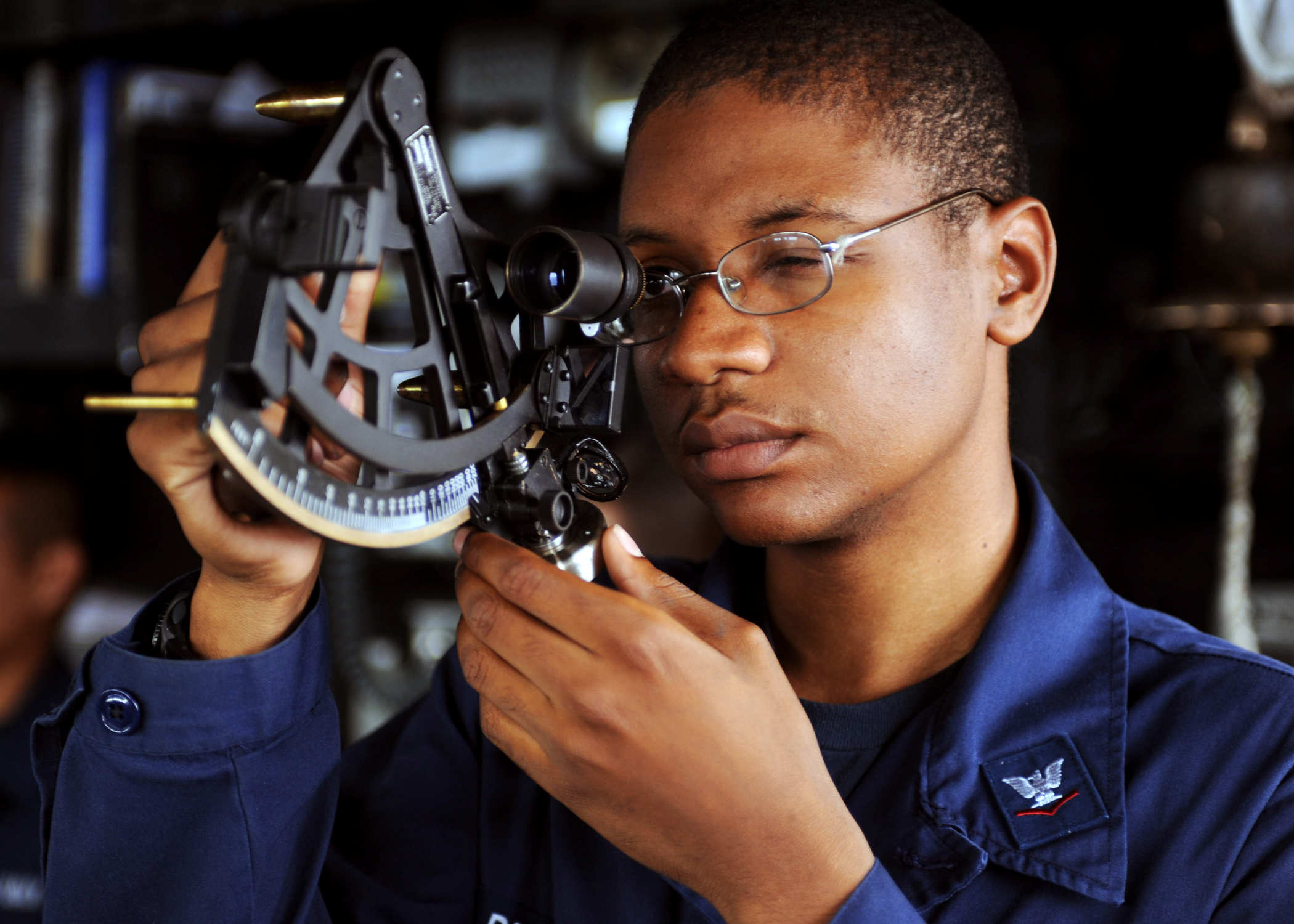
Quartermaster 3rd Class Jaren Briggs uses a stadimeter to measure range during an underway replenishment aboard the guided-missile cruiser USS Leyte Gulf.

- A stadimeter, a type of optical rangefinder, is an optical device for estimating the range to an object of known height by measuring the angle between the top and bottom of the object as observed at the device. It is similar to a sextant, in that the device is using mirrors to measure an angle between two objects but differs in that one dials in the height of the object. The stadimeter was invented in 1894 by Bradley Allen Fiske, a Rear-Admiral in the United States Navy. The first sea tests, conducted in 1895, showed that it was equally useful for fleet sailing and for navigation. Likewise, the stadimeter proved useful during the Battle of Manila Bay during the Spanish–American War. U.S. patent #523,721 was issued to Fiske on July 31, 1894.

1894 Mousetrap

- A mousetrap is a specialized type of animal trap designed primarily to catch mice. However, it may also trap other small animals. Mousetraps are usually set in an indoor location where there is a suspected infestation of rodents. The first mouse trap was invented by William C. Hooker of Abingdon, Illinois, exactly three years before James Henry Atkinson developed a prototype called the "Little Nipper". Atkinson probably saw the Hooker trap in shops or in advertisements, and copied it as the basis for his own model. Hooker received US patent #528671 for his invention, the mousetrap, in 1894.

1894 Medical glove

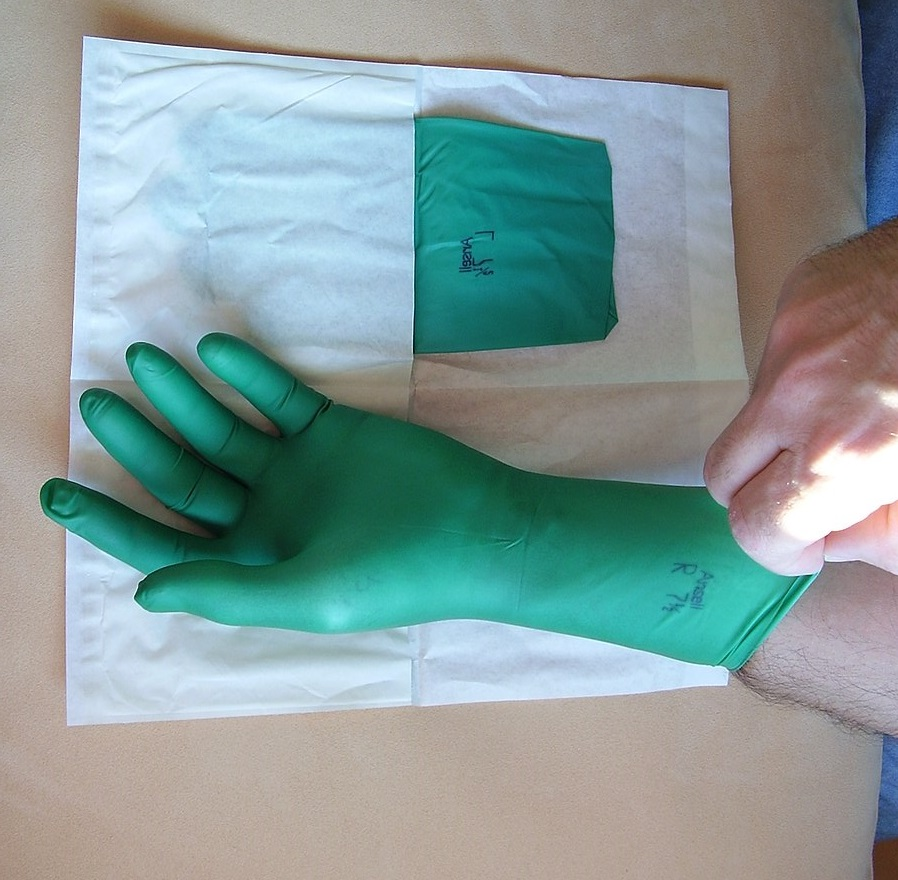
A disposal surgical glove

- Medical gloves are disposable gloves used during medical examinations and procedures that help prevent contamination between caregivers and patients. Medical gloves are made of different polymers including latex, nitrile rubber, vinyl and neoprene; they come unpowdered, or powdered with cornstarch to lubricate the gloves, making them easier to put on the hands. In 1894, William Stewart Halsted, the Surgeon-in-Chief of Johns Hopkins Hospital, invented the medical glove in an effort to make medical care safer and more sterile for patients and health care workers.

1895 Cyclocomputer

- A cyclocomputer or cyclometer is a device mounted on a bicycle that calculates and displays trip information, similar to the instruments in the dashboard of a car. The computer with display, or head unit, usually is attached to the handlebar for easy viewing. In 1895, Curtis Hussey Veeder invented the cyclometer.

1895 Clipless pedal

- Clipless pedals are bicycle pedals that require a special cycling shoe with a cleat fitted to the sole, which locks into a mechanism in the pedal and thus holds the shoe firmly to the pedal. Most clipless pedals lock onto the cleat when stepped on firmly and unlock when the heel is twisted outward, although in some cases the locking mechanism is built into the cleat instead of the pedal. The clipless pedal was invented in 1895 by Charles Hanson of Peace Dale, Rhode Island.

1895 Volleyball

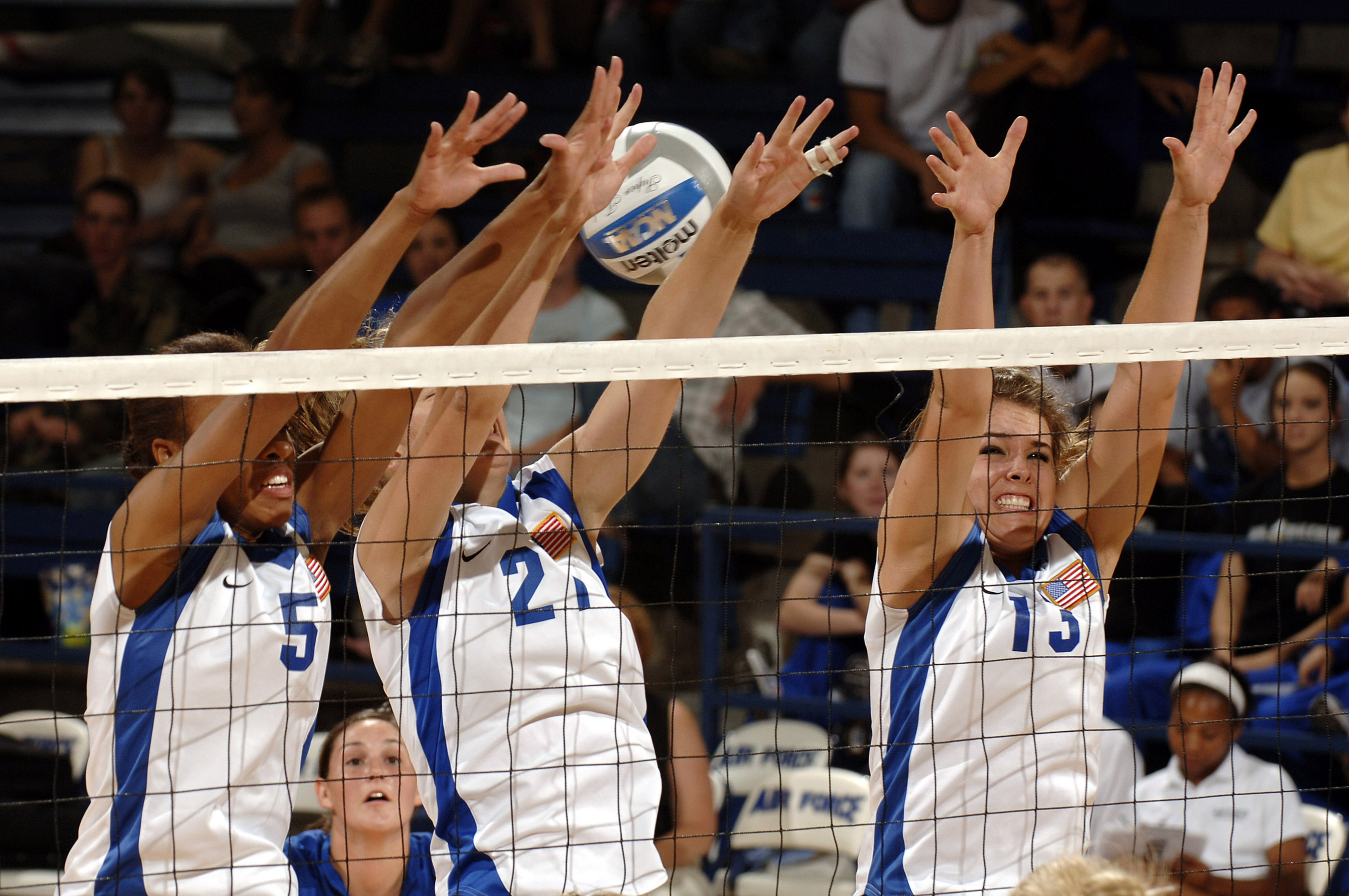
Three volleyball players performing a block

- Volleyball is an Olympic sport in which two teams of 6 active players are separated by a net. Each team tries to score points against one another by grounding a ball on the other team's court under organized rules. William G. Morgan invented the sport first known as "Mintonnette" in 1895 while studying at a YMCA in Holyoke, Massachusetts. It was later renamed volleyball by Alfred S. Halstead.

1897 Electric Cotton Candy Machine

- Cotton candy, Originally Created in the 1400s, is a soft confection made from sugar that is heated and spun into slim threads that look like a mass of cotton. In 1897 William Morrison & John C. Wharton Created The Electric Cotton Candy Machine, which made it easier and faster to make cotton candy.

1897 Muffler

- A muffler is a device for reducing the amount of noise emitted by a machine. On internal combustion engines, the engine exhaust blows out through the muffler. The internal combustion engine muffler was invented by Milton O. Reeves who received a patent in 1897.

1897 Tapered roller bearing

- Tapered roller bearings are bearings that can take large axial forces as well as being able to sustain large radial forces. They were co-invented by German-American Henry Timken and Reginald Heinzelman. On August 27, 1897, Timken and Heizelman filed U.S. patent #606,635 which was issued to them jointly on June 28, 1898.

1897 Ice cream scoop

- An ice cream scoop is any specialized spoon used to dish and serve ice cream. Most ice cream scoops are hemispherical-shaped and contain a mechanical device to force the ice cream out of the scoop. The ice cream scoop was invented by African-American Alfred L. Cralle who was issued U.S. patent #576,395 on February 2, 1897.

1897 Charcoal briquette

- A charcoal briquette, or briquet is a block of flammable charcoal matter which is used as fuel to start and maintain a fire, mainly used for food preparation over an open fire or a barbecue. Charcoal briquettes are made by using a process which consists of compressing charcoal, typically made from sawdust and other wood by-products, with a binder and other additives. The binder is usually starch. Some charcoal briquettes may also include brown coal, mineral carbon, borax, sodium nitrate, limestone, raw sawdust, and other additives like paraffin or petroleum solvents to aid in ignition. The design of the charcoal briquette was invented and patented by Ellsworth B. A. Zwoyer in 1897.

1897 Billiards cue chalk

- Cue chalk is a calcite or carbonate base applied to the tip of the cue stick used in billiards in order for players to reduce friction between the cue and bridge hand during shooting, as well as for a smoother stroke. Cue tip chalk was co-invented in its modern form by straight rail billiard pro William A. Spinks and chemist William Hoskins in 1897. U.S. patent #578,514 for cue chalk was issued to Spinks and Hoskins on March 9, 1897.

1898 Candy corn

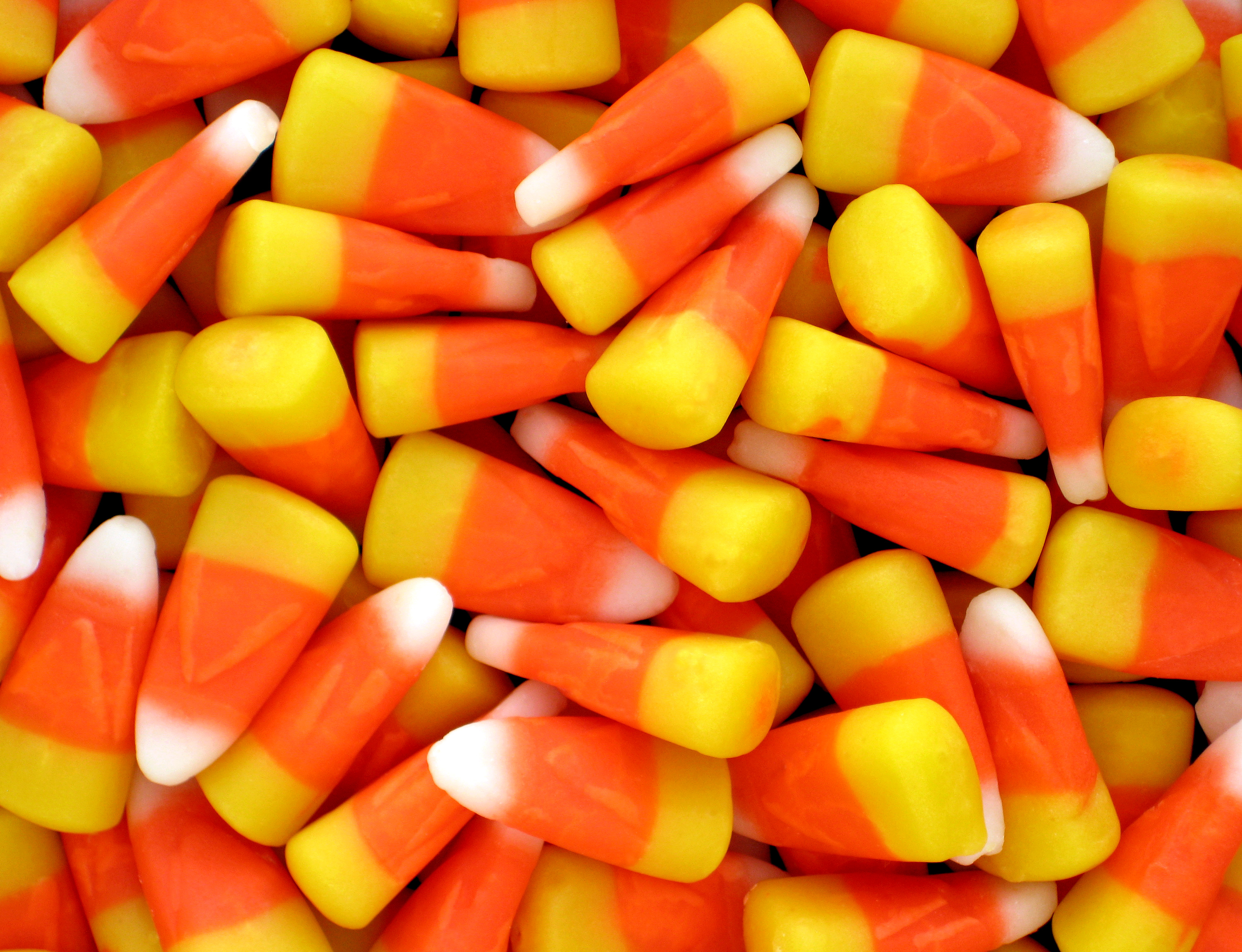
Candy corn is a popular treat for American children during Halloween.

- Candy corn is a confection in the United States and Canada, popular primarily in autumn around Halloween, that mimics the shape and coloration of corn kernels—a broad yellow end, a tapered orange center, and a pointed white tip. Candy corn is made primarily from sugar, corn syrup, artificial coloring and binders. It is generally thought that George Renninger, an employee of the Wunderlee Candy Company, invented candy corn in the 1880s. However, the earliest references credit the Goelitz Confectionery Company, now known as the Jelly Belly Candy Company, for introducing candy corn or "chicken feed" to the American public in 1898.

1898 Remote control

- A remote control is an electronic device used to operate any machine, such as a television, remotely. Many of these remotes communicate to their respective devices through infrared signals and radio control. In Madison Square Garden, at the Electrical Exhibition, Nikola Tesla gave the first demonstration of a boat propelling in water, controlled by his remote control which he designed using radio signals. Tesla received a patent for his invention in 1898.

1898 Semi-automatic shotgun

- A semi-automatic, or self-loading shot gun is a firearm that requires only a trigger pull for each round that is fired, unlike a single-action revolver, a pump-action firearm, a bolt-action firearm, or a lever-action firearm, which all require the shooter to chamber each successive round manually. In 1898, John Moses Browning invented the first semi-automatic shot gun, later patenting it in 1900. Naming it the Auto-5, Browning's semi-automatic relied on long recoil operation. This design remained the dominant form in semi-automatic shotguns for approximately 50 years, being widely used and the preferred weapon of choice among soldiers fighting in World War I. Production of the Auto-5 ceased in 1999.

1898 Semi-truck

- This is a type of truck connected to a detachable semi-trailer that carries freight. It was developed by Alexander Winton as a means of transporting cars without wasting their mileage.

1898 Filing cabinet (vertical)

- A filing cabinet is a piece of office furniture usually used to store paper documents in file folders. In the most simple sense, it is an enclosure for drawers in which items are stored. A vertical file cabinet has drawers that extend from the short side (typically 15 inches) of the cabinet. The vertical filing cabinet was invented by Edwin G. Seibels in 1898, thus revolutionizing efficient record-keeping and archiving by creating space for offices, schools, and businesses.

1898 Installer bit

- Installer bits are a type of twist drill bit for use with a hand-portable power tool. Installer bits are also known as bell-hanger bits or fishing bits. The key distinguishing feature of an installer bit is a transverse hole drilled through the web of the bit near the tip. Once the bit has penetrated a wall, a wire can be threaded through this transverse hole, and the bit pulled back through the drilled hole. The installer bit was invented and patented by Sinclair Smith of Brooklyn, New York, in 1898.

1893 Sousaphone

- The sousaphone, sometimes referred to as a marching tuba, is a wearable tuba descended from the hélicon. It was designed such that it fits around the body of the wearer and so it can be easily played while being worn. The sousaphone is named after John Philip Sousa but was invented by C.G. Conn in 1898.

1899 Wing warping

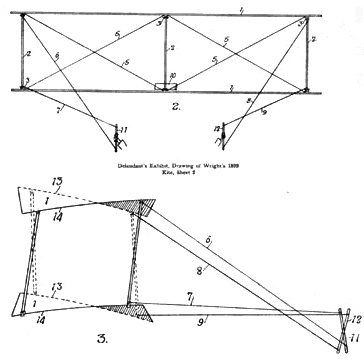
Diagram of the Wright brothers' 1899 kite, showing wing bracing and strings attached to hand-held sticks used for warping the wing while in flight

- Wing warping consists of the twisting motion of the wings of an aircraft to produce lateral control. The entire wing structure twists slightly in a helical motion in the desired direction. The concept of wing warping is attributed to Wilbur Wright who in 1899, came up with the idea and with the conclusion that the roll of an aircraft could be controlled by the motion of that aircraft's wings. Exemplified by the twisting of a long, narrow box, the Wright brothers incorporated wing warping on their 1899 glider that used ropes to pull on the wings. Later on, the young French engineer Robert Esnault-Pelterie replaced wing warping in 1904 with the aileron on a copy he made of a 19th-century Wright glider. However, it was Henry Farman, a French aviator, who was the first to use the aileron as an integral part of the wing structure in place of wing warping in 1908.

1899 Flash-lamp

- The electric flash-lamp is a device that uses an electrical circuit to trigger a fuse to ignite explosive powder such as magnesium, for a brief sudden burst of bright light "flash" from a chemical reaction of flash powder burning. It was principally used for flash photography in the early 20th century, but had other uses as well. The flash-lamp was invented and patented on November 7, 1899, by New York City resident Joshua Lionel Cowen.

1900 Duckpin bowling

Duckpin bowling is a variation of bowling that uses balls which are significantly smaller than those used in ten-pin bowling, weighing 1–3 kg (2.2–6.6 lb) each, which are without finger holes. The pins are correspondingly shorter and lighter than their ten-pin equivalents. Hence, when the pins are knocked down, they resemble a "flock of flying ducks". While the rules remained almost identical to those of the Ten-pin game, one rule change was made: A bowler is allowed to use three bowls on each turn. Strikes would still be strikes and spares still spares, but when all pins were knocked down on the third ball, it counts as a score of ten. During the summer of 1900, some bowlers at Diamond Alleys in Baltimore thought it might be interesting to resize the pins to match the 6-inch ball. Thus, the inventor of duckpin bowling, John Van Sant, used a wood turner to do exactly that.

1900 Nickel-zinc battery

- A nickel-zinc battery is a type of rechargeable battery that may be used in cordless power tools, cordless telephone, digital cameras, battery operated lawn and garden tools, professional photography, flashlights, electric bike, and light electric vehicle sectors. In 1900, Thomas Alva Edison filed U.S. Patent #684,204 for the nickel-zinc battery. It was issued on October 8, 1901.

1900 Merrill-Crowe process

- The Merrill-Crowe process is a separation technique for removing gold from a cyanide solution. The basic process was conceptualized and patented by Charles Washington Merrill around 1900, then later refined by Thomas B. Crowe, working for the Merrill Company.

1900 Carbide bicycle lamp

- Carbide lamps, also known as acetylene gas lamps, are simple lamps that produce and burn acetylene which is created by the reaction of calcium carbide with water. The first carbide lamp was invented and patented in New York City on August 28, 1900, by Frederick Baldwin.

1900 Fly swatter

- A fly swatter is a hand-held device for swatting and killing flies and other insects. The first modern fly-destruction device was invented in 1900 by Robert R. Montgomery, an entrepreneur based in Decatur, Illinois. On January 9, 1900, Montgomery was issued U.S. patent #640,790 for the "Fly-Killer".

1900 Thumbtack

- A thumbtack is a short nail or pin with a large, slightly rounded head made of metal which is used to fasten documents to a background for public display and which can easily be inserted or removed by hand. The thumbtack was invented by Edwin Moore around 1900, the year in which he founded the Moore Push-Pin Company.

1901 Key punch

- A keypunch is a device for manually entering data into punched cards by precisely punching holes at locations designated by the keys struck by the operator. Early keypunches were manual devices. Later keypunches were mechanized, often resembling a small desk, with a keyboard similar to a typewriter, and with hoppers for blank cards and stackers for punched cards. In 1901, Herman Hollerith invented and patented the mechanical key punch that was operated by keys, like a typewriter, and that advanced the card automatically to the next column after each punch. Later models would be motor driven with rudimentary programming features.

1901 Mercury-vapor lamp

- A mercury-vapor lamp is a gas discharge lamp which uses mercury in an excited state to produce light. The arc discharge is generally confined to a small fused quartz arc tube mounted within a larger borosilicate glass bulb. The outer bulb may be clear or coated with a phosphor. In either case, the outer bulb provides thermal insulation, protection from ultraviolet radiation, and a convenient mounting for the fused quartz arc tube. In 1901, Peter Cooper Hewitt invented and patented the mercury-vapor lamp.

1901 Assembly line

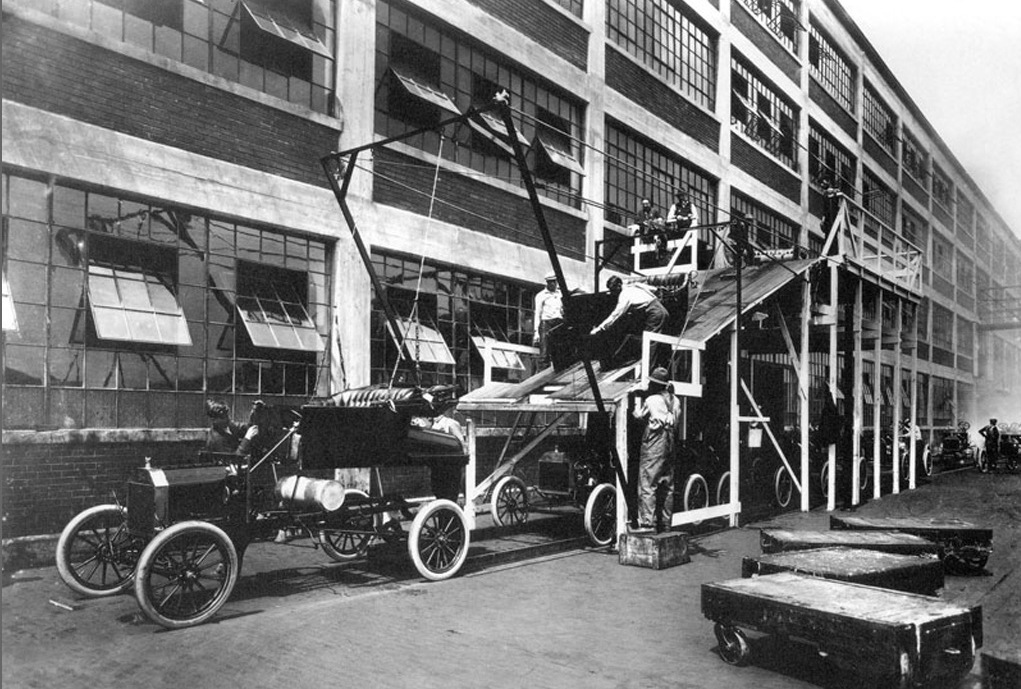
1913 Ford Model T assembly line production

- Used globally around the world, an assembly line is a manufacturing process in which interchangeable parts are added to a product in a sequential manner in order to create a finished product more quickly than with older methods. This type of manufacturing greatly reduces the amount of time taken to assemble a product, thus reducing production, material, and labor costs so that an affordable product cost can be passed onto consumers. According to a book entitled Michigan Yesterday & Today authored by Robert W. Domm, the assembly line and its basic concept is credited to Ransom Olds, who used it to build the first mass-produced automobile, the Oldsmobile Curved Dash. Olds patented the assembly line concept, which he put to work in his Olds Motor Vehicle Company factory in 1901. This development is often overshadowed by Henry Ford, who perfected the assembly line by installing driven conveyor belts that could produce a Model T in ninety-three minutes.

1901 Safety razor (disposable)

- A safety razor protects the skin from all but the edge of the blade while shaving skin. King Camp Gillette, a traveling hardware salesman of Fond du Lac, Wisconsin, invented the double-edged, disposable safety razor attached to a re-usable razor handle. Beforehand, dull razors were taken to barbers for sharpening. With Gillette's double-edged and disposable blades, a uniform shave on a man's face could be achieved with a fresh blade and disposed after it was used. Gillette applied for a patent in 1901. It was granted in 1904.

1901 Windowed envelope

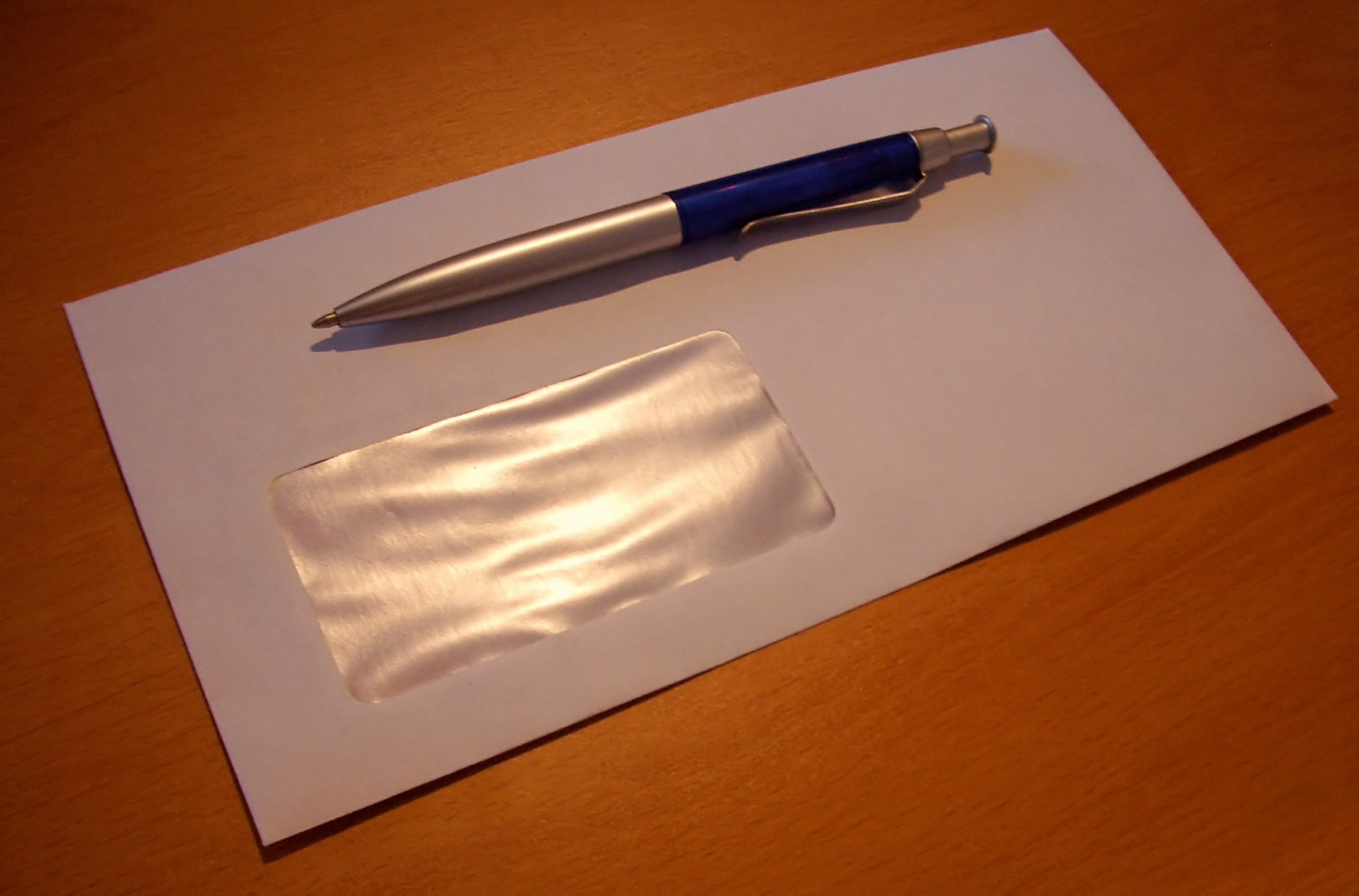
An example of a windowed envelope

- A windowed envelope is a conventional envelope with a plastic window to allow the recipient's address to be printed on the paper contained within. Windowed envelopes save the expense of printing or labor of addressing, and in addition save time in preparing the message for dispatch when the customary addresses are already on the letter paper itself. Calling it the "outlook envelope", Americus F. Callahan of Chicago was the first to patent the windowed envelope. U.S. patent #701,839 was filed on December 9, 1901, and issued on June 10, 1902.

1901 Radio direction finder

A radio direction finder (RDF) is a device for finding the direction to a radio source. Due to radio's ability to travel very long distances and "over the horizon", it makes a particularly good navigation system for ships, small boats, and aircraft that might be some distance from their destination. The radio direction finder is the earliest form of radio navigation. It was first patented by American physicist John Stone Stone. He filed on January 23, 1901, and was granted the patent (U.S. Patent 716,134) on December 16, 1902.

1902 Hearing aid

- A hearing aid is an electro-acoustic body-worn apparatus which typically fits in or behind the wearer's ear, and is designed to amplify and modulate sounds for the wearer. Although hearing aids in some form or fashion such as the ear trumpet were developed in previous years, the first electric hearing aid was invented by Miller Reese Hutchison in 1902.

1902 Postage meter

- A postage meter is a mechanical device used to create and apply physical evidence of postage, or franking, to mailed matter. Postage meters are regulated by a country's postal authority; for example, in the United States, the United States Postal Service specifies the rules for the creation, support, and use of postage meters. A postage meter imprints an amount of postage, functioning as a postage stamp, a cancellation and a dated postmark all in one. The postage meter was invented by Chicago inventor Arthur Pitney, receiving a patent for the invention on October 14, 1902.

1902 Teddy bear

- A teddy bear is a stuffed toy bear. They are usually stuffed with soft cotton and have smooth and soft fur. It is an enduring form of a stuffed animal that has become a collector's item. The first teddy bear was invented in 1902 by Morris Michtom, owner of a Brooklyn toy store, who was inspired by Clifford Berryman's political cartoon Drawing the Line in Mississippi that depicted President Theodore "Teddy" Roosevelt on a hunting trip in Mississippi who spared the life of a Louisiana black bear cub. Michtom asked for and received President Roosevelt's permission to use his name for the hand-sewn bears called "Teddy bears" that he invented and his wife helped construct.

1902 Periscope (collapsible)

- A periscope is an instrument for observation from a concealed position, known for use in submarines. In a simple form, it is a tube in each end of which are mirrors set parallel to each other and at an angle of 45 with a line between them. Periscopes allow a submarine, submerged at a shallow depth, to search for targets and threats in the surrounding sea and air. When not in use, the periscope is retracted into the hull. A sub commander in tactical conditions must exercise discretion when using his periscope, since it creates an observable wake and may be detectable to radar, giving away the sub's position. The invention of the collapsible periscope for use in submarine warfare is credited to Simon Lake in 1902, who called his device the omniscope or skalomniscope. Later, it was made to be raised and turned by hand.

1902 Mercury arc valve

- A mercury arc valve is a type of electrical rectifier which converts alternating current into direct current. Rectifiers of this type were used in electric motor power supplies for industry, in electric railways, streetcars, and diesel-electric locomotives. They also found use in static inverter stations and as rectifiers for high-voltage direct current power transmission. Mercury arc rectifiers were invented by Peter Cooper Hewitt in 1902.

1902 Air conditioning

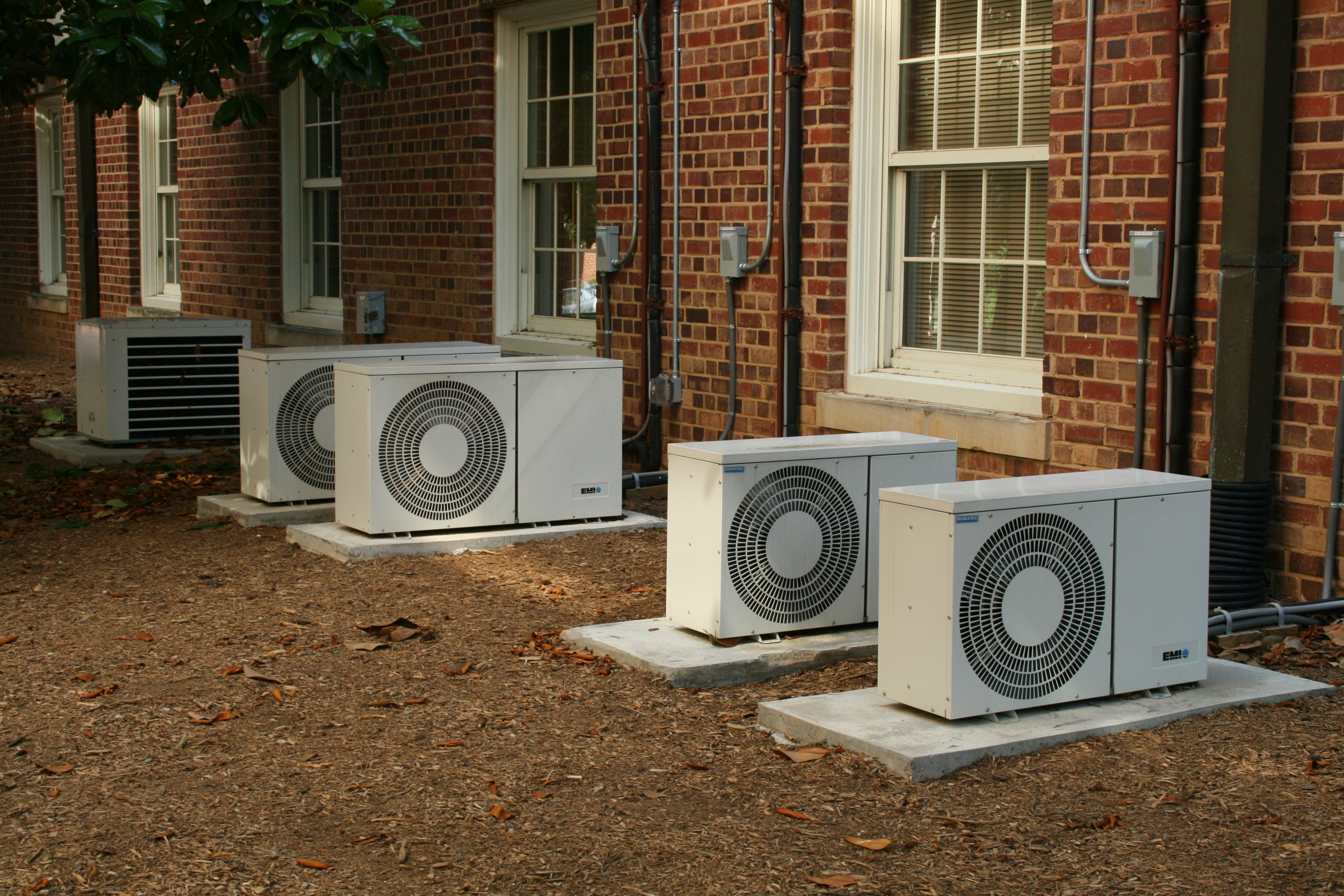
Air conditioning units outside a classroom building

Willis Carrier's invention of air conditioning in 1902 marked a pivotal moment in human history, transforming the way people interact with indoor spaces. Before his breakthrough, buildings were subject to the whims of nature, often becoming unbearably hot and humid during the summer months. Carrier's innovation provided a solution by allowing precise control over both temperature and humidity indoors. Carrier's invention – encompassing the first system to provide man-made control over temperature, humidity, ventilation and air quality, was first installed as a solution to the quality problems experienced at a Brooklyn printing plant, Sackett-Wilhelms Lithographing and Publishing Company. Air conditioning not only spawned a company and an industry, but also brought about profound economic, social and cultural changes.

1903 Tea bag

- A tea bag is a small, porous paper, silk or nylon sealed bag containing tea leaves for brewing tea. Tea bags were invented by Thomas Sullivan around 1903. The first tea bags were made from silk. Sullivan was a tea and coffee merchant in New York who began packaging tea samples in tiny silk bags, but many customers brewed the tea in them.

1903 Offset printing press

- Offset printing is a commonly used printing technique where the inked image is transferred from a plate to a rubber blanket, then to the printing surface. Ira Washington Rubel invented the first offset printing press in 1903.

1903 Airplane

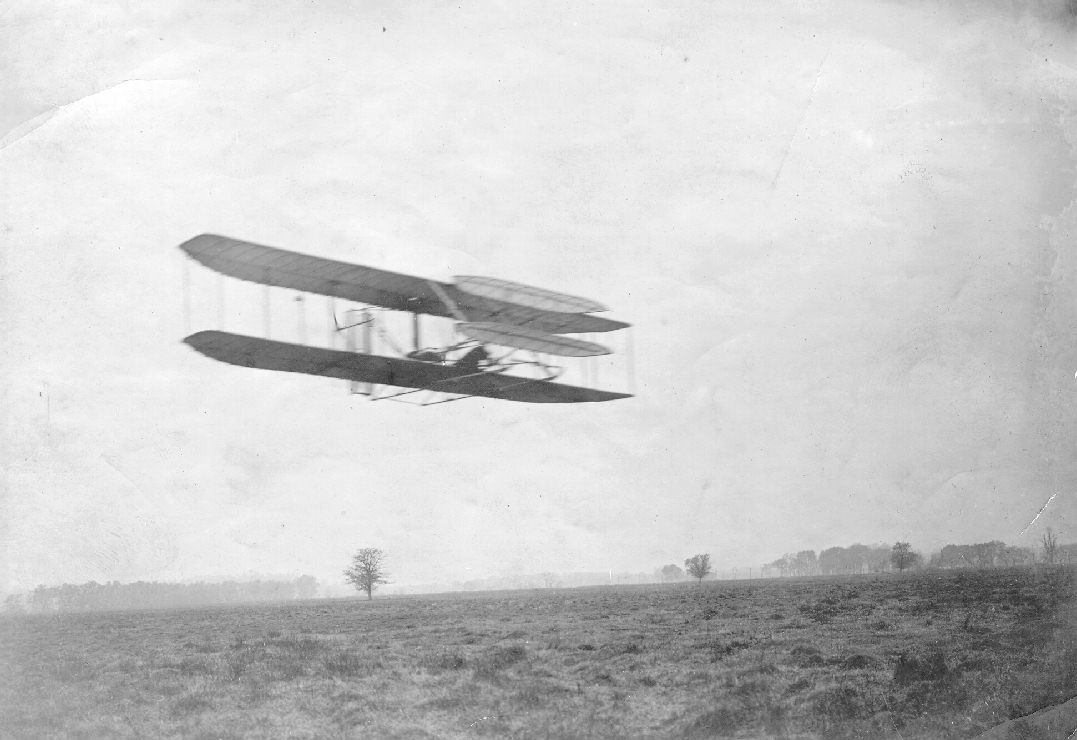
The Wright Flyer II flying almost four circles over Huffman Prairie, about 2 and 3/4 miles in 5 minutes and 4 seconds on November 9, 1904.

- A fixed-wing aircraft, or airplane, is a heavier-than-air craft whose lift is generated by air pressure differential between the upper and lower wing surfaces. The Wright brothers, Wilbur and Orville Wright of Dayton, Ohio, made the first powered and sustained airplane flights under control of the pilot in the Wright Flyer I on December 17, 1903, in Kitty Hawk, North Carolina. In the two years afterward, they developed their flying machine into the world's first practical fixed-wing aircraft. By October 1905, the Wright Flyer III was capable and proven to circle in the air 30 times in 39 minutes for a total distance of 24.5 miles. The brothers' fundamental breakthrough was their invention of "three-axis control", which enabled the pilot to steer the aircraft effectively and to maintain its equilibrium. This required method has become standard on all fixed-wing aircraft. From the beginning of their aeronautical work, the Wright brothers focused on unlocking the secrets of control to conquer "the flying problem", rather than on developing more powerful engines as some other experimenters did. Charles Edward Taylor built the first aircraft engine and was a vital contributor of mechanical aspects in the building and maintaining of early Wright engines and airplanes. Although there were many earlier attempts at heavier-than-air powered flight, some of which achieved successful short hops, and disputed earlier claims of sustained flight, the Wright brothers are officially credited by the Fédération Aéronautique Internationale, the international record-setting body for aeronautics and astronautics, as achieving "the first sustained and controlled heavier-than-air powered flight". In addition, U.S. patent number #821393 for the airplane, was filed by Orville Wright on March 23, 1903, and was issued in May 1906.

1903 Windshield wipers

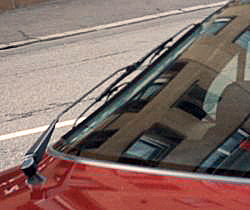
A windshield wiper with motorized arm

- The windshield wiper is a bladed device used to wipe rain and dirt from a windshield. In 1903, Mary Anderson is credited with inventing the first operational windshield wiper. In Anderson's patent, she called her invention a window cleaning device for electric cars and other vehicles. Operated via a lever from inside a vehicle, her version of windshield wipers closely resembles the windshield wiper found on many early car models. Anderson had a model of her design manufactured. She then filed a patent (U.S. patent number 743,801) on June 18, 1903, that was issued to her by the U.S. Patent Office on November 10, 1903.

1903 Wood's glass

- Wood's glass is a light filter used in communications during World War I. An "invisible radiation" technique which worked both in infrared daylight communication and ultraviolet night communications, it does not transmit visible light, leaving the 'invisible radiation' as a signal beam. Wood's glass was invented by Robert Williams Wood in 1903.

1903 Wood's lamp

- A Wood's lamp is a diagnostic tool used in dermatology which shines ultraviolet light onto the skin of the patient; a technician then observes any subsequent fluorescence. Though the technique for producing a source of ultraviolet light was devised by Robert Williams Wood in 1903 using "Wood's glass", not until 1925 was the technique used in dermatology by Margarot and Deveze for the detection of fungal infection of hair.

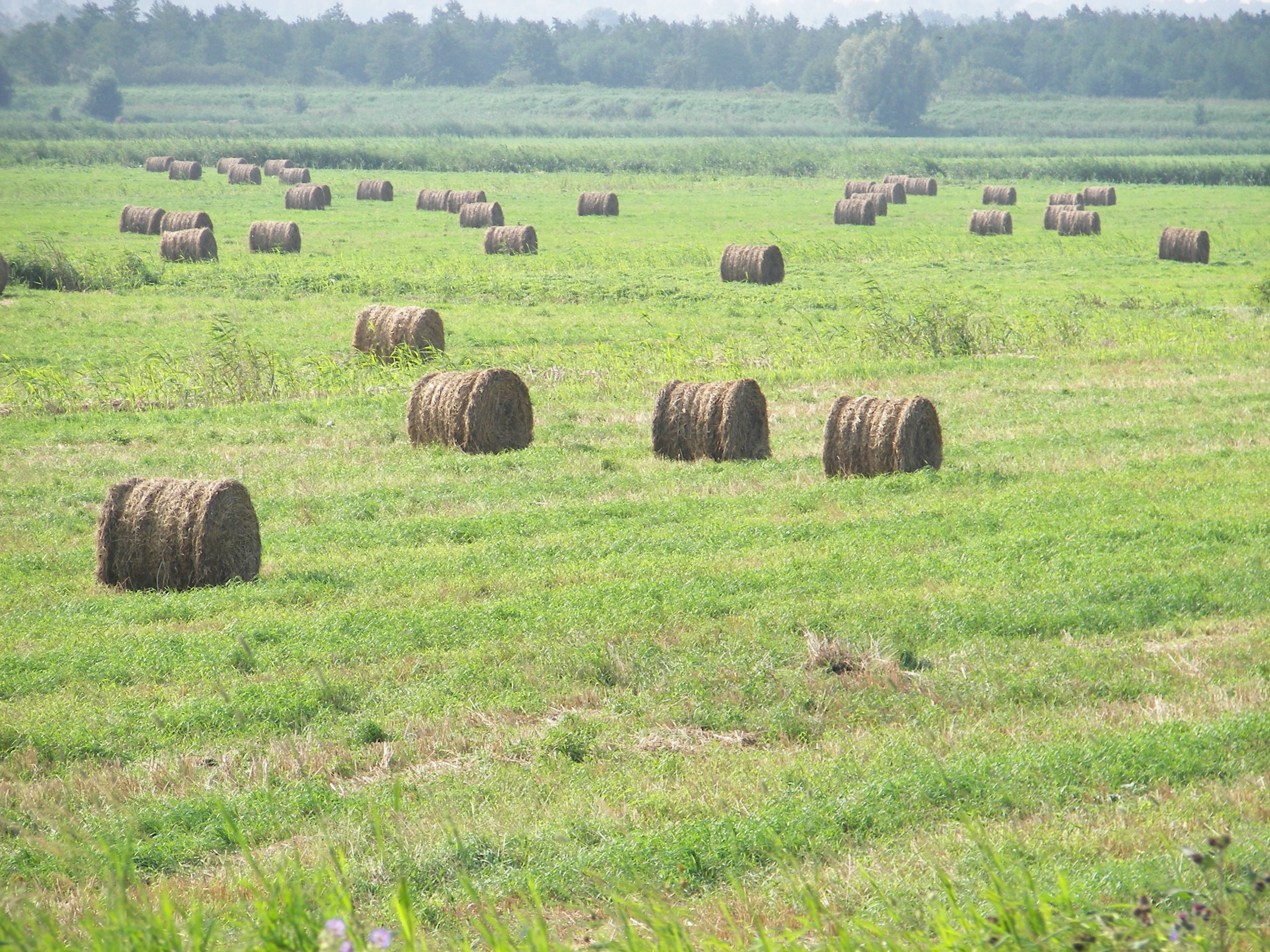
Round hay bales near Elbląg Canal, Poland

1903 Baler (round)

- A baler is a piece of farm machinery used to compress a cut and raked crop (such as hay, straw, or silage) into compact bales that are easy to handle, transport and store. Several different types of balers are commonly used, each producing a different type of bales – rectangular or cylindrical (round), of various sizes, bound with twine, netting, or wire. The round hay baler was invented by Ummo F. Luebben of Sutton, Nebraska, which he conceived with his brother Melchior in 1903, and then patented in 1910. The invention of the round hay baler revolutionized the laborious task of haying into a one-man, low-cost operation with a machine that automatically gathered the hay, rolled into a round bale, and ejected it.

1904 Automatic transmission

- An automatic transmission is an automobile gearbox that changes gear ratios automatically as the vehicle moves, freeing the driver from having to shift gears manually. Modern automatic transmissions trace their origins to an early "horseless carriage" gearbox that was developed in 1904 by the Sturtevant brothers of Boston, Massachusetts.

1904 Banana split

- A banana split is an ice cream-based dessert. In its classic form it is served in a long dish called a boat. A banana is cut in half lengthwise (hence the split) and laid in the dish. There are many variations, but the classic banana split is made with scoops of vanilla, chocolate and strawberry ice cream served in a row between the split banana. Although the banana as an exotic fruit was introduced to the American public in the 1880s, it was later in 1904, that the banana split was invented in the town of Latrobe, Pennsylvania, by 23-year-old pharmacy apprentice David Strickler, who was inspired to create a new sundae after seeing a soda jerk during a visit to Atlantic City. According to The Food Chronology, written in 1995 by James Trager, Strickler concocted his sundae to include three scoops of ice cream on a split banana, topped with chocolate syrup, marshmallow, nuts, whipped cream, and a cherry that sold for a dime. Other soda jerks soon imitated Strickler's banana split, albeit in other forms.

1904 Pantograph (diamond-shaped)

- A pantograph is a device that collects electric current from overhead lines for electric trains or trams. The term stems from the resemblance to pantograph devices for copying writing and drawings. In 1904, the diamond-shaped roller pantograph was invented by John Q. Brown of the Key System shops for their commuter trains which ran between San Francisco and the East Bay section of the San Francisco Bay Area in California. A patent was issued on July 5, 1904.

1904 Dragline excavator

- Drag-line excavation systems are heavy equipment used in civil engineering and surface mining. In civil engineering the smaller types are used for road and port construction. The larger types are used in strip-mining operations to move overburden above coal, and for tar-sand mining. A drag line bucket system consists of a large bucket which is suspended from a boom, a large truss-like structure, with wire ropes. The bucket is maneuvered by means of a number of ropes and chains. The hoist rope, powered by large diesel or electric motors, supports the bucket and hoist-coupler assembly from the boom. The drag rope is used to draw the bucket assembly horizontally. By skillful maneuver of the hoist and the drag ropes the bucket is controlled for various operations. The dragline excavator was invented in 1904 by John W. Page.

1905 Batting helmet

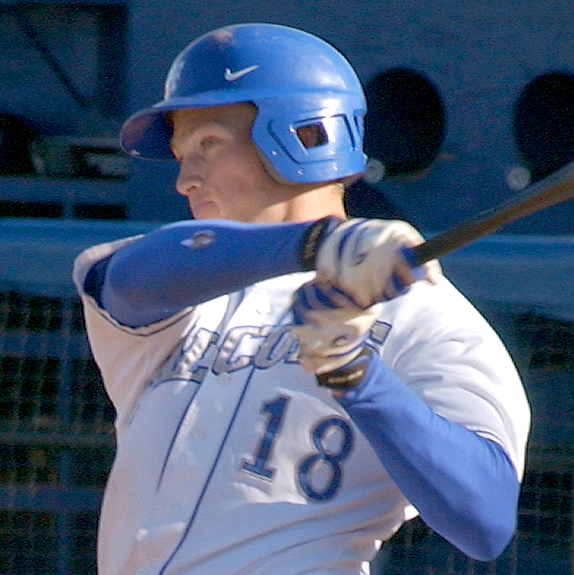
A batter wearing a batting helmet

- A batting helmet is the protective headgear worn by batters in the game of baseball or softball. It is meant to protect the batter's head from errant pitches thrown by the pitcher. A batter who is "hit by pitch", due to an inadvertent wild pitch or a pitcher's purposeful attempt to hit him, may be seriously, even fatally, injured. In 1905, a New York Giants (the team now known as the San Francisco Giants) baseball player named Roger Bresnahan, after missing thirty days of the baseball season and lying in a hospital bed due to a head injury (or beaning), created, with assistance from the A.J. Reach Company, a crude, leather, vertically sliced football helmet over his cap that is considered to be the first batting helmet. The headgear was unpopular, even with Bresnahan at the time, and it wasn't until the mid-1950s that his idea was accepted.

1905 Liquid ring pump

- A liquid ring pump is a rotating positive displacement pump that is powered by an induction motor and is typically used as a vacuum pump or as a gas compressor. The liquid ring pump was invented in 1905 by Lewis H. Nash. Production soon began thereafter at the Nash Engineering Company. Nash filed U.S. patent #1,091,529 on February 24, 1910, and was issued to him on March 31, 1914.

1905 Ice pop

- An ice pop is a frozen water-based dessert on a stick. It is made by freezing a colored, flavored liquid around a stick. Once the liquid freezes solid, the stick can be used as a handle to hold the ice pop. The ice pop was invented by 11-year-old Frank Epperson in 1905. Living in San Francisco, California, Epperson had left a fruit drink out overnight, with a stirrer in it, thus making it freeze. In 1923, Epperson got a patent on his "frozen ice on a stick". Epperson also invented the twin ice pop, with two sticks so it could be shared by two children. The most famous brand name associated with the ice pop is Popsicle.

1906 Typesetting

- Typesetting is the retrieval of the stored letters and the ordering of them according to a language's orthography for visual display. Typesetting was invented by John Raphael Rogers of Brooklyn, New York, who filed U.S. patent #837127 on October 8, 1906, and issued to him on November 27, 1906.

1906 Flushometer

- A flushometer, or royal flushometer is a water pressure system that uses an inline handle to flush toilets and urinals. By using pressurized water directly from the supply line, there is a faster recycle time between flushes. The flushometer is still in use today in homes and public restrooms around the world. The flushometer was invented in 1906 by American businessman and inventor William Elvis Sloan.

1906 Audion tube

- The Audion is an electronic amplifier device and was the forerunner of the triode, in which the current from the filament to the plate was controlled by a third element, the grid. A small amount of power applied to the grid could control a larger current from the filament to the plate, allowing the Audion both to detect radio signals and to provide amplification. The Audion tube was invented by Lee De Forest in 1906.

1907 Curtain rod

- A curtain rod or traverse rod is a device used to suspend curtains, usually above windows or along the edges of showers, though also wherever curtains might be used. The flat, telescoping curtain rod was invented by Charles W. Kirsch of Sturgis, Michigan, in 1907. However, they were not in use until the 1920s. Kirsch also invented the traverse curtain rod in 1928.

1907 Electrostatic precipitator

- An electrostatic precipitator (ESP), or electrostatic air cleaner is a particulate collection device that removes particles from a flowing gas (such as air) using the force of an induced electrostatic charge. Electrostatic precipitators are highly efficient filtration devices that minimally impede the flow of gases through the device, and can easily remove fine particulate matter such as dust and smoke from the air stream. In 1907, the California physicist Frederick G. Cottrell invented and received a patent for the electrostatic precipitator.

1907 Paper towel

- A paper towel has the same purposes as conventional towels such as drying hands, wiping windows, dusting, cleaning up spills. However, paper towels can only be used once after they blot wet surfaces. A school teacher in Ashland, Ohio, named Kurt Klier, gave students individual paper squares, so that the single towel in the bathroom would not be infected with germs. When Arthur Scott, head of the Scott Paper Company heard about it, he decided to try to sell a load of paper that had been made too thick to use as toilet paper.

1908 Candy apple

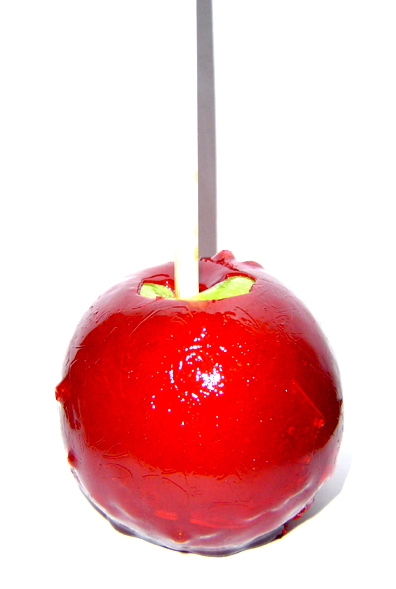
A candy apple

- Candy apples, also known as toffee apples outside of North America, are whole apples covered in a hard sugar candy coating. While the topping varies from place to place, they are almost always served with a wooden stick of sorts in the middle making them easier to eat. Toffee apples are a common treat at autumn festivals in Western culture in the Northern Hemisphere, such as Halloween and Guy Fawkes Night because these festivals fall in the wake of the annual apple harvest. Dipping fruits into a sugar syrup is an ancient tradition. However, the origin of the red candy apple is attributed to Newark, New Jersey, candymaker who conceived the idea of dipping apples into a red cinnamon candy mixture he had on hand. In addition, dipping apples in hot caramel a 1950s American invention attributed to Kraft salesman Dan Walker.

1909 Skee ball

- Skee ball is a common game found in arcades and one of the first redemption games. Skee ball is similar to bowling except it is played on an inclined lane and the player aims to get the ball to fall into a hole rather than knock down pins. The object of the game is to collect as many points as possible by rolling balls up an incline and into the designated point value holes. Skee ball was invented and patented in 1909 by J.D. Estes of Philadelphia.

1909 Paper shredder

- Paper shredders are used to cut paper into chad, typically either strips or fine particles. Government organizations, businesses, and private individuals use shredders to destroy private, confidential, or otherwise sensitive documents. The first paper shredder is credited to prolific inventor Abbot Augustus Low of Horseshoe, New York. His patent for a "waste paper receptacle" to offer an improved method of disposing of waste paper received a U.S. patent on August 31, 1909.

1909 Suppressor

- A suppressor or silencer is a device either attached to or part of the barrel of a firearm to reduce the amount of noise and flash generated by firing the weapon. It generally takes the form of a cylindrically shaped metal tube with various internal mechanisms to reduce the sound of firing by slowing the escaping propellant gas, and sometimes by reducing the velocity of the bullet. Hiram Percy Maxim, the son of famous machine gun inventor Hiram Stevens Maxim, is credited with inventing the suppressor in 1909.

1909 Gin rummy

- Gin rummy, or Gin for short, is a simple and popular two-player card game with a standard 52-card pack. The objective of Gin Rummy is to score more points than your opponent improving one's hand by forming melds and eliminating deadwood. Gin rummy was invented by Elwood T. Baker and his son, C. Graham Baker in 1909.

1910 Headset

- A headset is a headphone combined with a microphone. Headsets provide the equivalent functionality of a telephone handset with hands-free operation. They are used in call centers and by people in telephone-intensive jobs. The first-ever headset was invented in 1910, by a Stanford University student named Nathaniel Baldwin.

1911 Fifth wheel coupling

- The fifth wheel coupling provides a pivoting link between a semi-trailer and the towing truck, tractor unit, leading trailer or dolly. Some recreational vehicles have a fifth wheel configuration, requiring the coupling to be installed in the bed of a pickup truck as a towing vehicle. The coupling consists of a coupling pin (or kingpin) on the front of the semi-trailer, and a horseshoe-shaped coupling device called a fifth wheel on the rear of the towing vehicle. In 1911, Charles Martin invented the fifth wheel coupler consisting of a round plate with a hole in it, attached to a frame mounted on his tractor.

1911 Erector Set

- An Erector Set is a toy construction set that consists of collections of small metal beams with regular holes for nuts, bolts, screws, and mechanical parts such as pulleys, gears, and small electric motors. Popular in the United States, the brand name is currently used for Meccano sets (themselves patented in 1901). The erector set was invented in 1911 by Alfred Carlton Gilbert and was manufactured by the A. C. Gilbert Company at the Erector Square factory in New Haven, Connecticut. The first sets were called by A.C. Gilbert "The Erector / Structural Steel & Electro-Mechanical Builder". Accessory sets were also available to allow children to upgrade basic sets.

1911 Binder clip

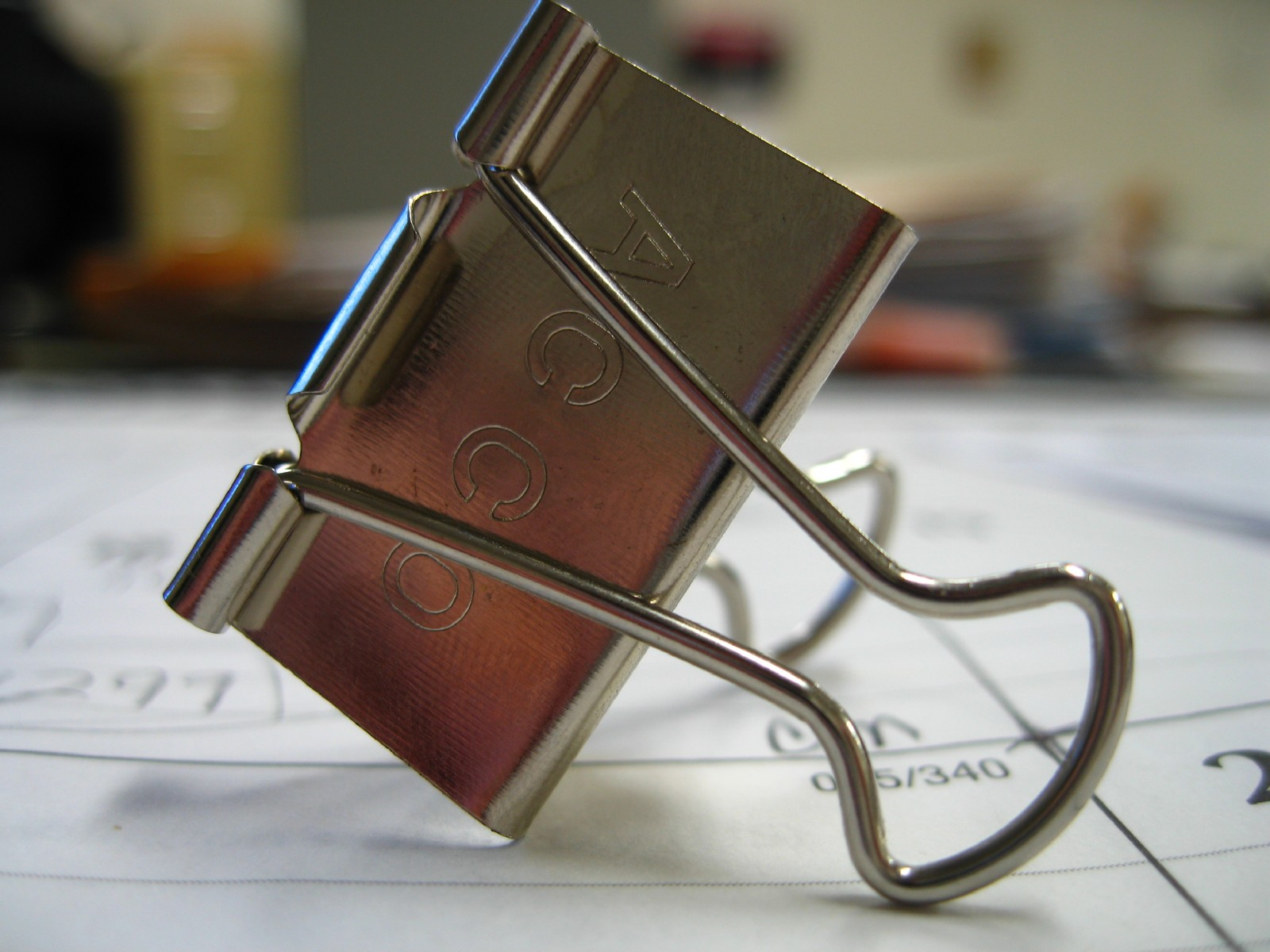
A single, large binder clip

- A binder clip, or a banker's clip or foldback clip, is a simple device for binding sheets of paper together. It leaves the paper intact and can be removed quickly and easily unlike the staple. The binder clip was invented in 1911 by Washington, D.C., resident Louis E. Baltzley who was motivated by a desire to help his father, Edwin, a prolific writer and inventor, keep manuscripts in order. The original design was modified five times, but the essential mechanism has never changed.

1911 Automobile self starter

- An automobile self-starter is an electric motor that initiates rotational motion in an internal combustion engine before it can power itself, therefore eliminating the hand crank used to start engines. In 1911, Charles F. Kettering invented the automobile self-starter while working at National Cash Register and then sold them for installation on cars at the Cadillac company. There had been many attempts at producing an electric starter before, but none of them were successful. Most designs at that time called for the use of an electric motor attached to the engine's flywheel. However, in order to fit in the car's engine compartment, the device would have to be small, and therefore it would be unable to produce sufficient torque.

1911 Road surface marking

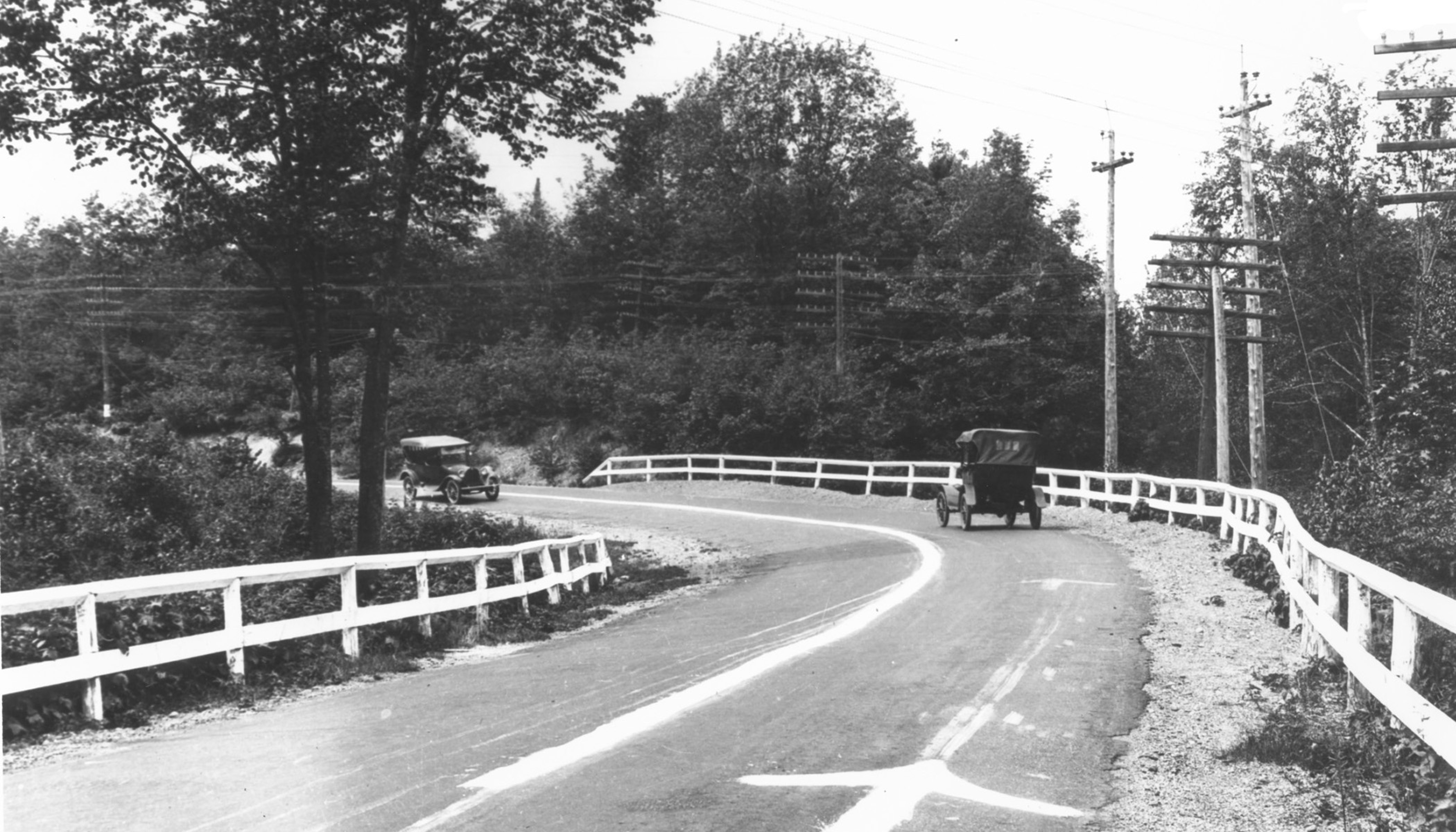
Dead Man's Curve along the Marquette–Negaunee Road in Michigan, shown in 1917 with the first hand-painted centerline

- A road surface marking is any kind of device or material that is used on a road surface in order to convey official information for drivers and pedestrians. Edward N. Hines originated the concept of painting a line down the center of a road to separate traffic in opposing directions. They were first used in Wayne County, Michigan, in 1911.

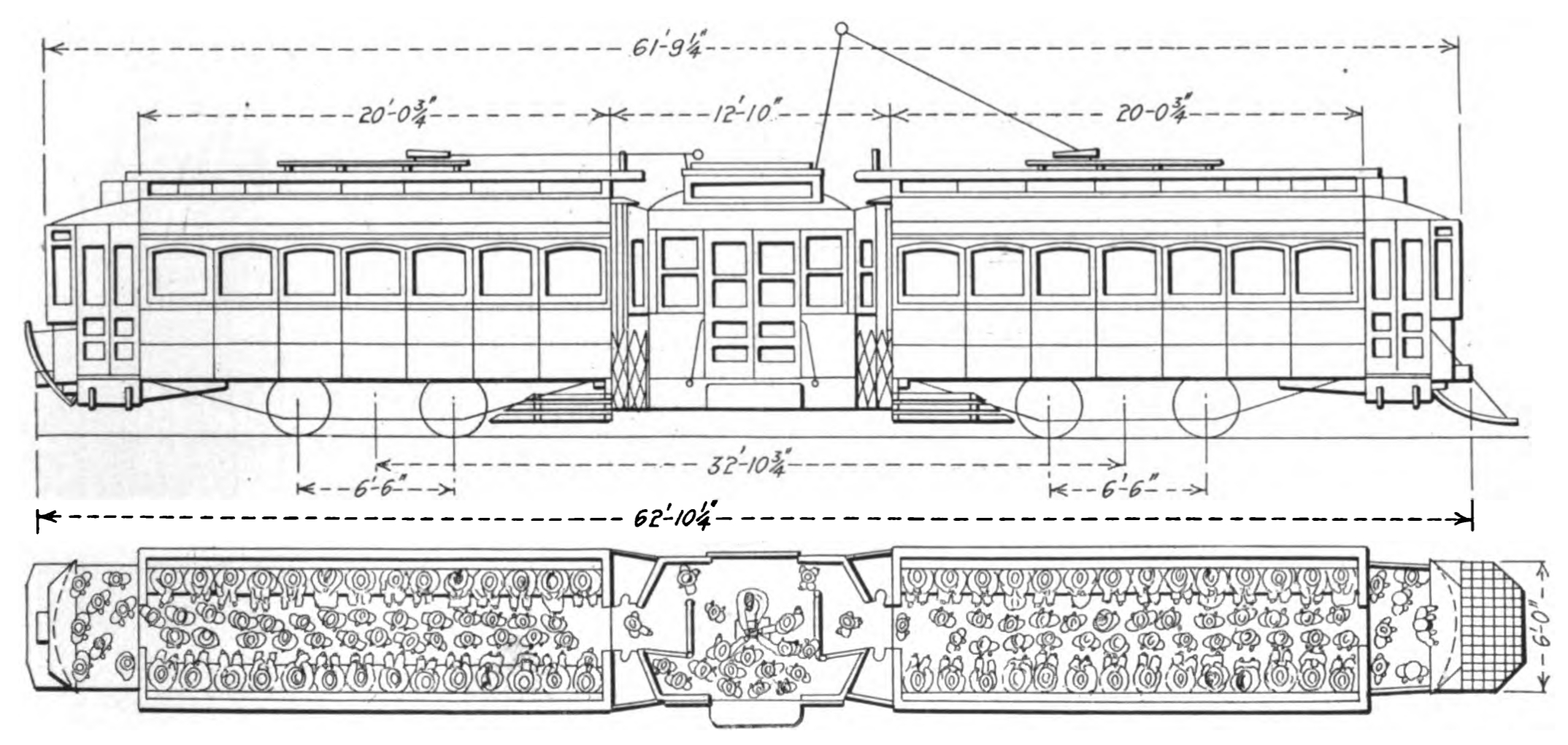
Diagram of BERy articulated tram, 1912

1912 Articulated tram

- The articulated tram was first used on the Boston Elevated Railway.

1912 Autopilot

- An autopilot is a mechanical, electrical, or hydraulic system used to guide a vehicle without assistance from a human being. Most people understand an autopilot to refer specifically to aircraft, but self-steering gear for ships, boats, space craft, and missiles is sometimes also called autopilot. The first aircraft autopilot was invented by Lawrence Sperry in 1912. Sperry demonstrated it in 1914, and proved the credibility of the invention by flying the aircraft with his hands away from the controls and visible to onlookers.

1912 Electric blanket

- An electric blanket is a blanket with an integrated electrical heating device usually placed above the top bed sheet. The first electric blanket was invented in 1912 by American physician Sidney I. Russell. This earliest form of an electric blanket was an 'underblanket' under the bed that covered and heated from below. In 1937, Electric 'overblankets which lie on top of the sleeping person were introduced in the United States.

1912 Traffic light (electric)

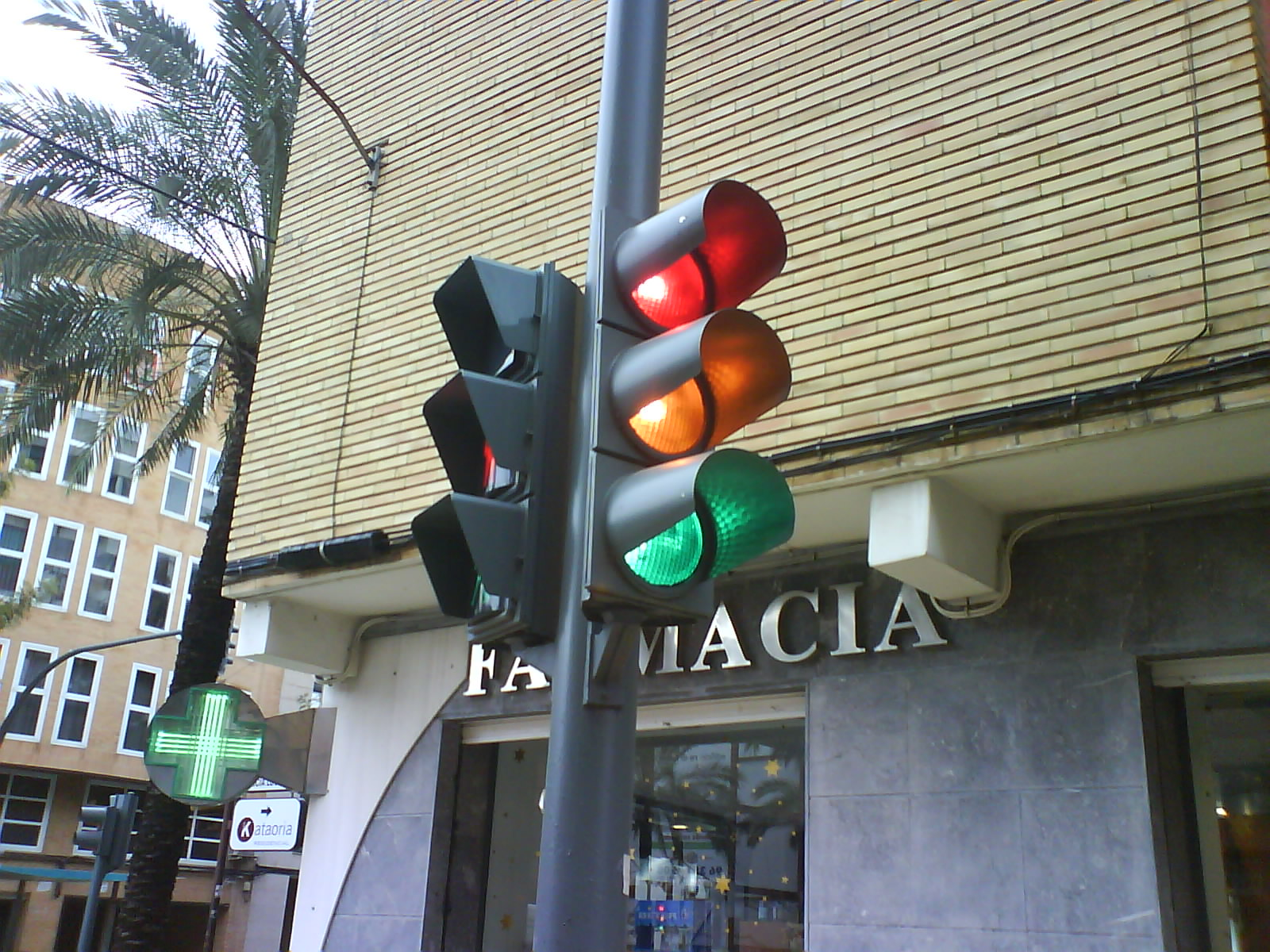
Traffic lights in Spain

- The traffic light, also known as traffic signal, is a signaling device positioned at a road intersection, pedestrian crossing, or other location. Its purpose is to indicate, using a series of colors, the correct moment to stop, drive, ride or walk, using a universal color code. The color of the traffic lights representing stop and go are likely derived from those used to identify port (red) and starboard (green) in maritime rules governing right of way, where the vessel on the left must stop for the one crossing on the right. In Salt Lake City, Utah, policeman Lester Wire invented the first red-green electric traffic lights.

1913 Formica (plastic)

- Formica is a hard durable plastic laminate used for countertops, cupboard doors, and other surfaces which are heat-resistant and easy to clean. Formica was invented in 1913 by Herbert A Faber and Daniel J. O'Connor of Westinghouse Electric.

1914 Regenerative circuit

- The regenerative circuit allows an electronic signal to be amplified many times by the same vacuum tube or other active component such as a field effect transistor. A regenerative circuit is often an AM detector, converting the RF signal on the antenna to an audio waveform. Their use of positive feedback greatly increases both the selectivity and sensitivity of a simple receiver. Positive feedback builds up the input signal to very high levels. Edwin Armstrong, invented and patented the regenerative circuit while he was a junior in college, in 1914.

1914 Traffic cone

- Traffic cones, also called toddlers, road cones, safety cones, construction cones, pylons, or witches' hats, are usually cone-shaped markers that are placed on roads or sidewalks to temporarily redirect traffic in a safe manner. Traffic cones were invented in 1914 by Charles P. Rudabaker.

1914 Fortune cookie

- A fortune cookie is a crisp cookie usually made from flour, sugar, vanilla, and oil with a "fortune" wrapped inside. A "fortune" is a piece of paper with words of faux wisdom or a vague prophecy. In the United States, it is usually served with Chinese food in Chinese restaurants as a dessert. The message inside may also include a list of lucky numbers and a Chinese phrase with translation. Contrary to belief, the fortune cookie associated as a Chinese invention is a fallacy. In 1914, the Japanese-American named Makoto Hagiwara of the Japanese Tea Garden in San Francisco, California, introduced the fortune cookie and is thus recognized as its inventor.

1915 Skeet shooting

- Skeet shooting is an Olympic sport where participants attempt to break clay disks flung into the air at high speed from a variety of angles. The firearm of choice for this task is usually a high quality, double-barreled over and under shotgun with 28/30 inch barrels and open chokes. The event is in part meant to simulate the action of bird hunting. The shooter shoots from eight positions on a semicircle with a radius of 21 yards (19 m), and an 8th position halfway between stations 1 and 7. There are two houses that hold devices known as "traps" that launch the targets, one at each corner of the semicircle. Skeet shooting began in Andover, Massachusetts, in 1915, when grouse hunter Charles Davis invented a game he called "shooting around the clock" to improve his wingshooting.

1915 Single-sideband modulation

- Single-sideband modulation (SSB) is a refinement of amplitude modulation that more efficiently uses electrical power and bandwidth. Single-sideband modulation produces a modulated output signal that has a bandwidth identical to that of the original baseband signal, unlike amplitude modulation which has double the bandwidth. Although John Renshaw Carson invented SBB in 1915, his patent was not granted until March 27, 1923.

1916 Hamburger bun

- A hamburger bun is a bread roll sliced horizontally containing a hamburger, usually a patty consisting of ground meat that also typically contains lettuce, bacon, tomato, onion, pickles, cheese and condiments such as mustard, mayonnaise, ketchup and relish. The hamburger bun was invented in 1916 by a fry cook named Walter Anderson, who co-founded White Castle in 1921.

1916 Lincoln Logs

- Lincoln Logs are a children's toy consisting of notched miniature wooden logs, used to build miniature forts, cabins, and buildings. Lincoln Logs were invented in 1916 by John L. Wright, son of famous American architect Frank Lloyd Wright.

1916 Supermarket

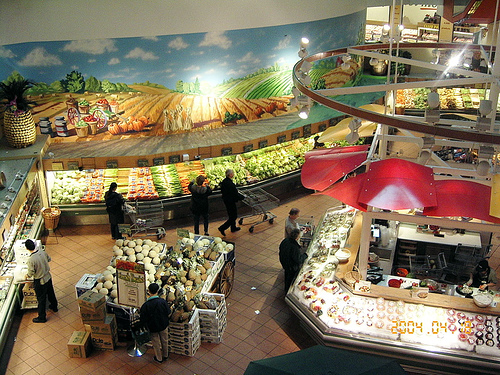
The interior of a supermarket in Toronto, Canada

- A supermarket is a self-service store offering a wide variety of food and household merchandise, organized into departments. It is larger in size and has a wider selection than a traditional grocery store. The concept of a "self-service" grocery store was invented by American entrepreneur Clarence Saunders and his Piggly Wiggly stores. Beforehand, customers would shop at a general store where a clerk behind a counter would fetch inventory in limited quantity for customers to purchase. With Saunders' new innovation of self-service, customers would be able to choose a wider selection of goods at competitive prices. Saunders' first store opened in Memphis, Tennessee, in 1916.

1916 Cloverleaf interchange

- A cloverleaf interchange is a two-level interchange in which left turns, in countries that drive on the right, are handled by loop roads. To go left, in right-hand traffic, vehicles first pass either over or under the other road, then turn right onto a one-way three-fourths loop ramp (270°) and merge onto the intersecting road. The cloverleaf was first patented in the United States by Arthur Hale, a civil engineer in Maryland, on February 29, 1916.

1916 Tow truck

- A tow truck is a vehicle used to transport motor vehicles to another location, generally a repair garage, or to recover vehicles which are no longer on a drivable surface. Vehicles are often towed in the case of breakdowns or collisions, or may be impounded for legal reasons. The tow truck was invented in 1916 by Ernest Holmes Sr., of Chattanooga, Tennessee. He was a garage worker who was inspired to create the invention after he was forced to pull a car out of a creek using blocks, ropes, and six men. An improved design led him to manufacture wreckers.

1916 Condenser microphone

- A condenser microphone, also called a capacitor microphone or electrostatic microphone, is a microphone containing a capacitor that has two plates with a voltage between them. In the condenser microphone, one of these plates is made of very light material and acts as the diaphragm. The diaphragm vibrates when struck by sound waves, changing the distance between the two plates and therefore changing the capacitance. Specifically, when the plates are closer together, capacitance increases and a charge current occurs. When the plates are further apart, capacitance decreases and a discharge current occurs. A voltage is required across the capacitor for this to work. This voltage is supplied either by a battery in the mic or by external phantom power. The condenser microphone was invented in 1916 at Bell Laboratories by Edward Christopher 'E.C.' Wente, which became possible with the advent of the vacuum tube (valve) to act as an amplifier of the low signal output.

1916 Light switch (toggle)

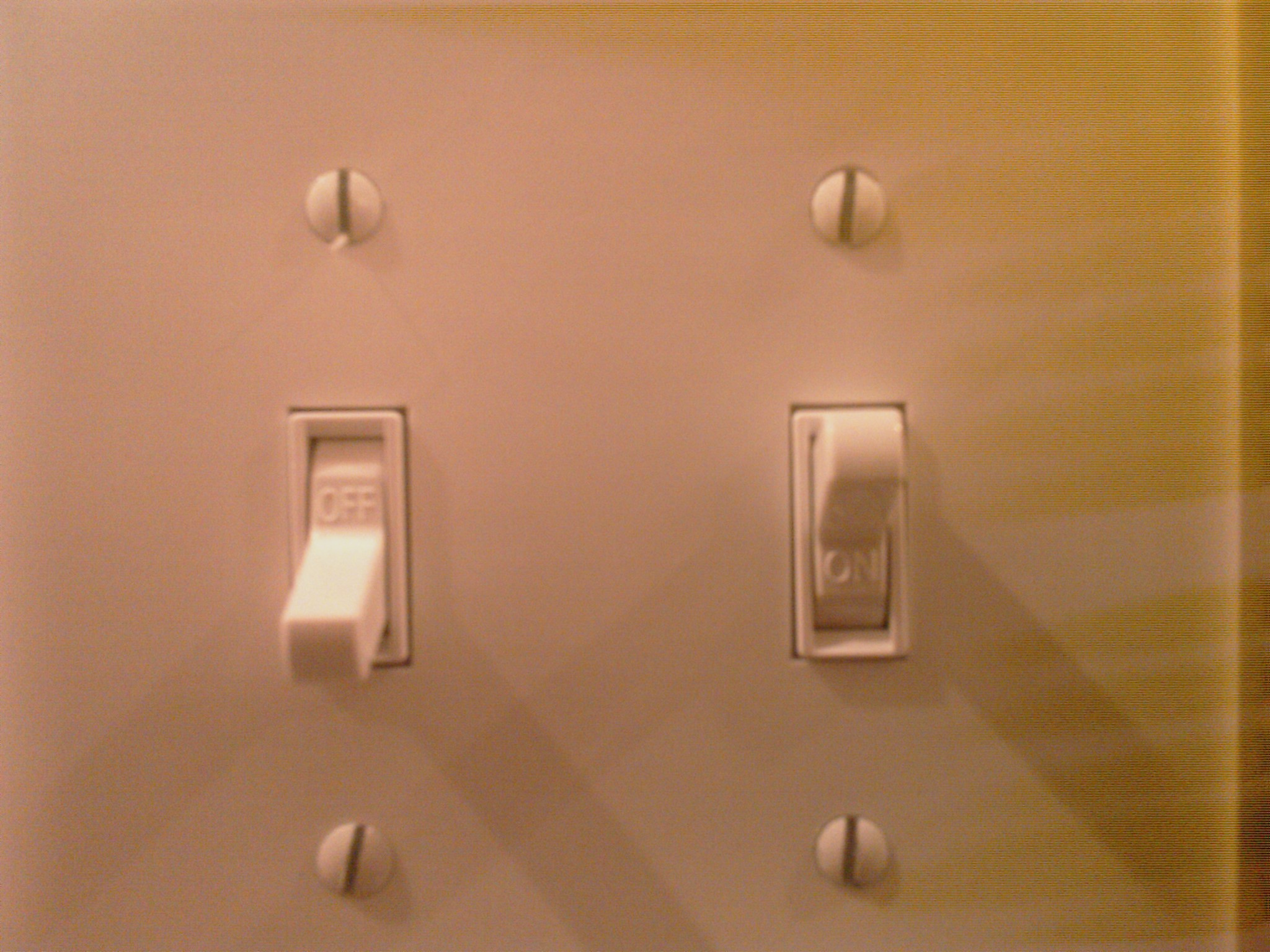
An example of on/off toggle light switches mounted on a wall

- A toggle light switch is a switch, most commonly used to operate electric lights, permanently connected equipment, or electrical outlets whereby the switch handle does not control the contacts directly, but through an intermediate arrangement of internal springs and levers. The toggle light switch is safe, reliable, and durable, but produces a loud "snap" or "click" noise when a person's finger manually flips the toggle light switch into the on/off position. The design for the toggle light switch was patented in 1916 by William J. Newton and Morris Goldberg of Lynbrook, New York.

1917 Stream cipher

- In cryptography, a stream cipher is a symmetric key cipher where plaintext bits are combined with a pseudorandom cipher bit stream, typically by an exclusive-or (xor) operation. In a stream cipher the plaintext digits are encrypted one at a time, and the transformation of successive digits varies during the encryption. Also known as a state cipher, the stream cipher was invented in 1917 by Gilbert Sandford Vernam at Bell Labs.

1917 Marshmallow creme

- Marshmallow creme, better known as marshmallow "fluff" in the United States, is a food item that is a sweet, spreadable, marshmallow-like confection. It is typically used with peanut butter on the fluffernutter sandwich. In addition, marshmallow creme and Nutella can be spread on graham crackers to emulate s'mores. Marshmallow creme is a New England creation invented in 1917 by Archibald Query of Somerville, Massachusetts.

1918 Superheterodyne receiver

- In electronics, a superheterodyne receiver uses frequency mixing or heterodyning to convert a received signal to a fixed intermediate frequency, which can be more conveniently processed than the original radio carrier frequency. Virtually all modern radio and television receivers use the superheterodyne principle. The superheterodyne receiver was invented in 1918 by Edwin Armstrong. It was introduced to the market place in the late 1920s.

1918 French dip sandwich

- A French dip sandwich, also known as a beef dip, is a hot sandwich consisting of thinly sliced roast beef (or, sometimes, other meats) on a "French roll" or baguette. It is usually served au jus ("with juice"), that is, with beef juice from the cooking process. Beef broth or beef consommé is sometimes substituted. Despite the sandwich's name, the French dip sandwich was not invented in France, but in the United States. Both Philippe the Original's and Cole's Pacific Electric Buffet, two restaurants in Los Angeles, claim to have invented the French dip sandwich. Philippe Mathieu may have possibly invented the sandwich by accident around the year 1918, who according to one story, accidentally dropped a sandwich in a pan of au jus'. Another story is that a fireman to Philippe's restaurant found his roast beef sandwich roll to be too hard. Thus, Philippe had it dipped in juice. Whatever the origin, Cole's Pacific Electric Buffet also claims to have invented the French dip sandwich as well.

1918 Torque wrench

- A torque wrench is a tool used to precisely apply a specific torque to a fastener such as a nut or bolt. It is usually in the form of a socket wrench with special internal mechanisms. It was invented by Conrad Charles Bahr in 1918. However, it wasn't until much later on March 16, 1937, that Bahr received U.S. patent #2,074,079 for the invention of the torque wrench.

1918 Crystal oscillator

- A crystal oscillator is an electronic circuit that uses the mechanical resonance of a vibrating crystal of piezoelectric material to create an electrical signal with a very precise frequency. This frequency is commonly used to keep track of time as used in quartz wristwatches, to provide a stable clock signal for digital integrated circuits, and to stabilize frequencies for radio transmitters and receivers. The first crystal-controlled oscillator, using a crystal of Rochelle Salt, was invented by Alexander M. Nicolson. However, it is generally accepted that Dr. Walter Guyton Cady was the first to use a quartz to control the frequency of an oscillator circuit. Nevertheless, Nicolson is still regarded as the inventor of the crystal oscillator.

1918 Grocery bag

- Shopping bags are medium-sized bags, typically around 10–20 litres (2.5 to 5 gallons) in volume, that are often used by grocery shoppers to carry home their purchases. They can be single-use (disposable), used for other purposes or designed as reusable shopping bags. The grocery bag with handles was invented in 1918 by Walter Deubener of St. Paul Minnesota. U.S. patent #1,305,198 was issued to Deubener on May 27, 1919.

1918 Hydraulic brake

- The hydraulic brake is an arrangement of braking mechanism which uses brake fluid, typically containing ethylene glycol, to transfer pressure from the controlling unit, which is usually near the operator of the vehicle, to the actual brake mechanism, which is usually at or near the wheel of the vehicle. In 1918, the hydraulic brake was invented by Malcolm Loughead, which replaced the mechanical brake which was used previously on automobiles.

1919 Blender

- A blender is an upright, stationary kitchen appliance used to mix alcoholic beverages and puree food. Blenders are also used to prepare emulsions, such as mayonnaise, and cream soups. In 1919, Polish-American Stephen J. Poplawski of Racine, Wisconsin, invented, designed, and manufactured beverage mixers used in preparation for malted milk served at soda fountains. It consisted of a spinning blade on a long rod extending down into a cup. Poplawski patented his invention of the blender in 1922.

1919 Silica gel

- Silica gel is a granular, porous form of silica made from sodium silicate. The synthetic route for silica gel was invented and patented in 1919 by chemistry professor Walter A. Patrick at Johns Hopkins University in Baltimore.

1919 Toaster (pop-up)

- The toaster is typically a small electric kitchen appliance designed to toast multiple types of bread products such as sliced bread, bagels, and English muffins. Although not the first to invent the toaster, the pop-up toaster was invented by Charles Strite in 1919, consisting of a variable timer and springs in order to prevent burnt toast. Strite received a patent for his invention on May 29, 1919.

== Roaring Twenties and the Jazz Age (1920–1928) ==
1920 Eskimo Pie

- An Eskimo Pie is a vanilla ice cream bar between two wafers of chocolate and wrapped in aluminum foil. The confection was invented in Iowa in the year 1920 by Danish-American Christian Nelson. First known as the I-Scream Bar, the name was changed the following year to Eskimo Pie at the suggestion of American chocolatier Russell Stover.

1920 Jungle gym

- The jungle gym, also known as monkey bars or climbing frame, is a piece of playground equipment made of many pieces of thin material, such as metal pipe or, in more current playgrounds, rope, on which children can climb, hang, or sit. The monkey bar designation was for the resemblance that playing children had to the rambunctious, climbing play of monkeys, though the term nowadays often refers specifically to a single row of overhead bars designed to be swung across. The jungle gym was invented and patented by Sebastian Hinton of Chicago in 1920.

1921 Polygraph

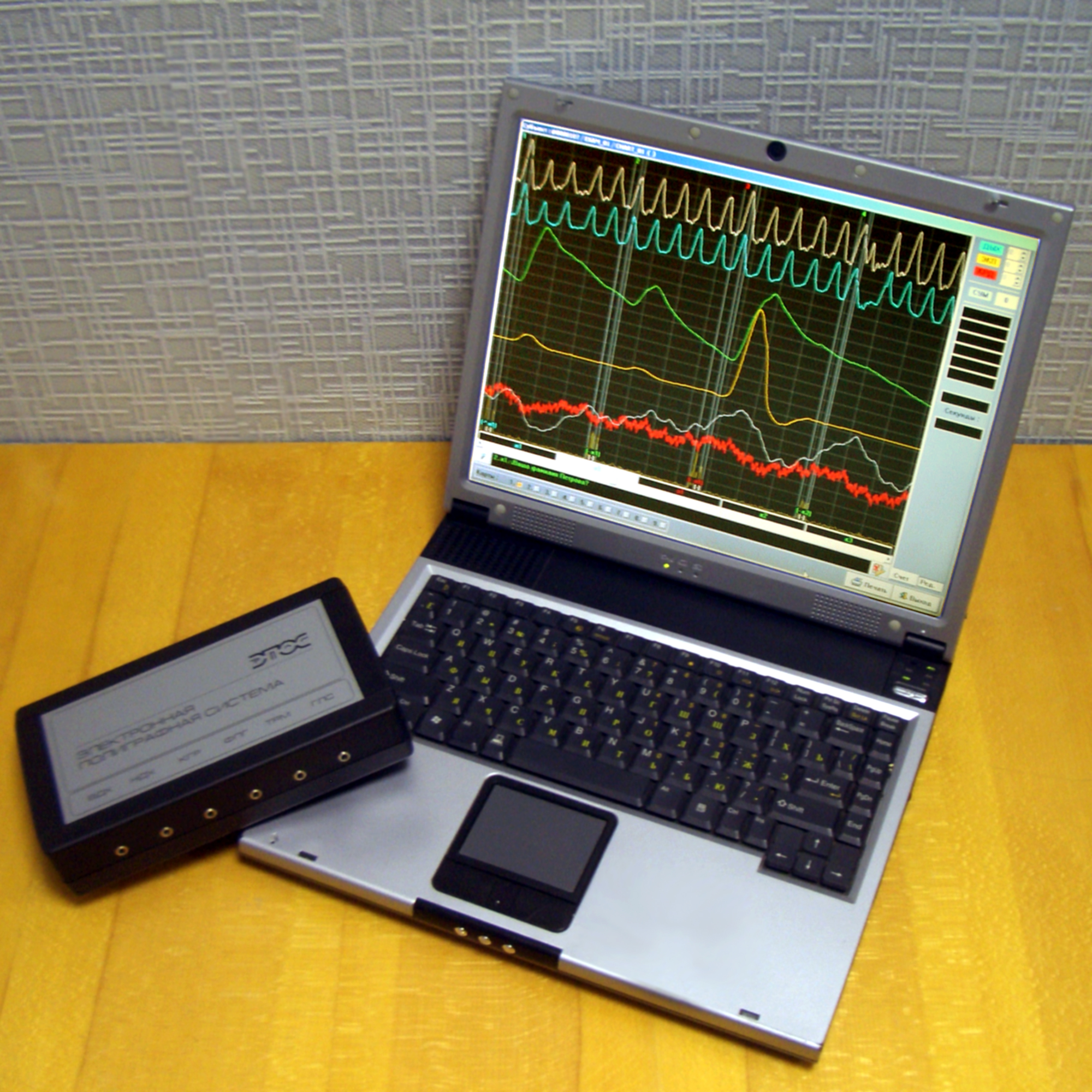
A modern polygraph system

- Not to be confused with an earlier and different invention with the same name, a polygraph, popularly referred to as a lie detector, is an instrument that measures and records several physiological indices such as blood pressure, pulse, respiration, and skin conductivity while the subject is asked and answers a series of questions, in the belief that deceptive answers will produce physiological responses that can be differentiated from those associated with non-deceptive answers. The polygraph was invented in 1921 by John Augustus Larson, a medical student at the University of California at Berkeley and a police officer of the Berkeley Police Department in Berkeley, California. According to Encyclopædia Britannica, the polygraph was on its 2003 list of the 325 greatest inventions.

1921 Flowchart

- A flowchart is common type of chart, representing an algorithm or process, showing the steps as boxes of various kinds, and their order by connecting these with arrows. Flowcharts are used in analyzing, designing, documenting or managing a process or program in various fields. The second structured method for documenting process flow, the "flow process chart", was invented by Frank Gilbreth to members of ASME in 1921 as the presentation "Process Charts—First Steps in Finding the One Best Way".

1921 Adhesive bandage

- Popularly known by the brand name Band-Aid, an adhesive bandage is a self-sticking taped and small dressing used for injuries not serious enough to require a full-size bandage. This easy-to-use dressing with adhesive tape was invented by Earle Dickson in 1921.

1921 Headrest

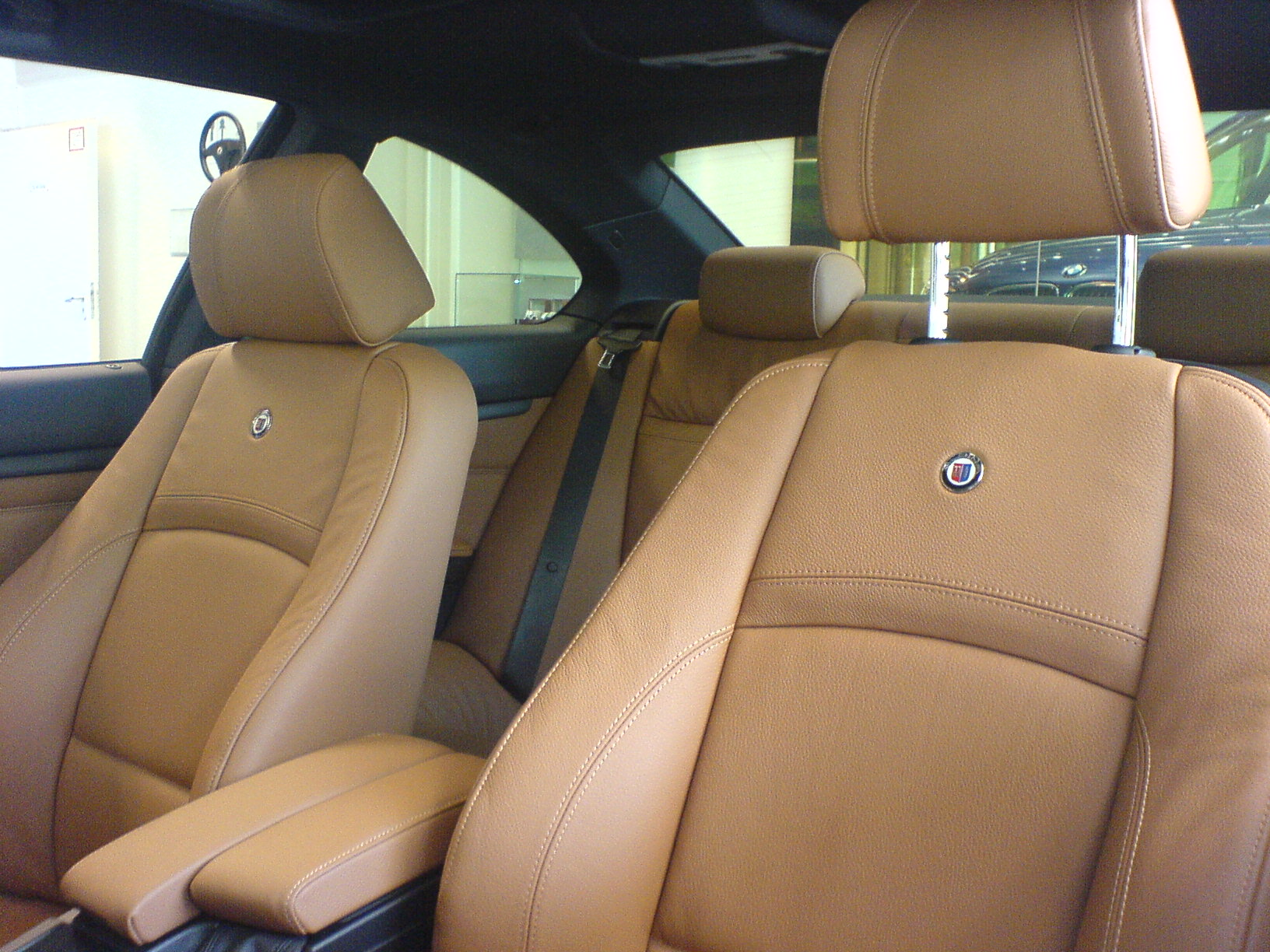
An example of headrests in the interior of a BMW Alpina

- In an automobile, the headrest or head restraint is a device attached to the top of the seat behind the occupant's head. Most headrests are cushioned for comfort, are height adjustable and most commonly finished in the same material as the rest of the seat. The automobile headrest was invented by Benjamin Katz, a resident of Oakland, California, in 1921. U.S. patent #1,471,168 for the headrest was issued to Katz on October 16, 1923.

1921 Garage door

- A garage door is a large door on a garage that can either be opened manually or by a garage door opener. Garage doors are necessarily large to allow passage of automobiles and/or trucks. In 1921, C. G. Johnson of Detroit invented the "Overhead Door", the first upward-lifting garage door. To market the garage door, Johnson mounted a small prototype of his door on the back of his Model T Ford and drove around the United States signing up distributors.

1922 Blowout preventer (ram)

- A ram blowout preventer is a large valve that can seal off a wellhead by using ram-types employing steel cut off rams to seal the borehole. During drilling or well interventions, the valve may be closed if overpressure from an underground zone causes formation fluids such as oil or natural gas to enter the wellbore and threaten the rig. In 1922, James Smither Abercrombie collaborated with Harry S. Cameron with the idea of creating a mechanically operated ram-type blowout preventer. A patent was issued in January 1926.

1922 Convertible

- A convertible is a type of automobile in which the roof can retract and fold away having windows which wind-down inside the doors, converting it from an enclosed to an open-air vehicle. Many different automobile body styles are manufactured and marketed in convertible form. Ben P. Ellerbeck conceived the first practical retractable hardtop system in 1922—a manually operated system on a Hudson coupe that allowed unimpeded use of the rumble seat even with the top down.

1922 Water skiing

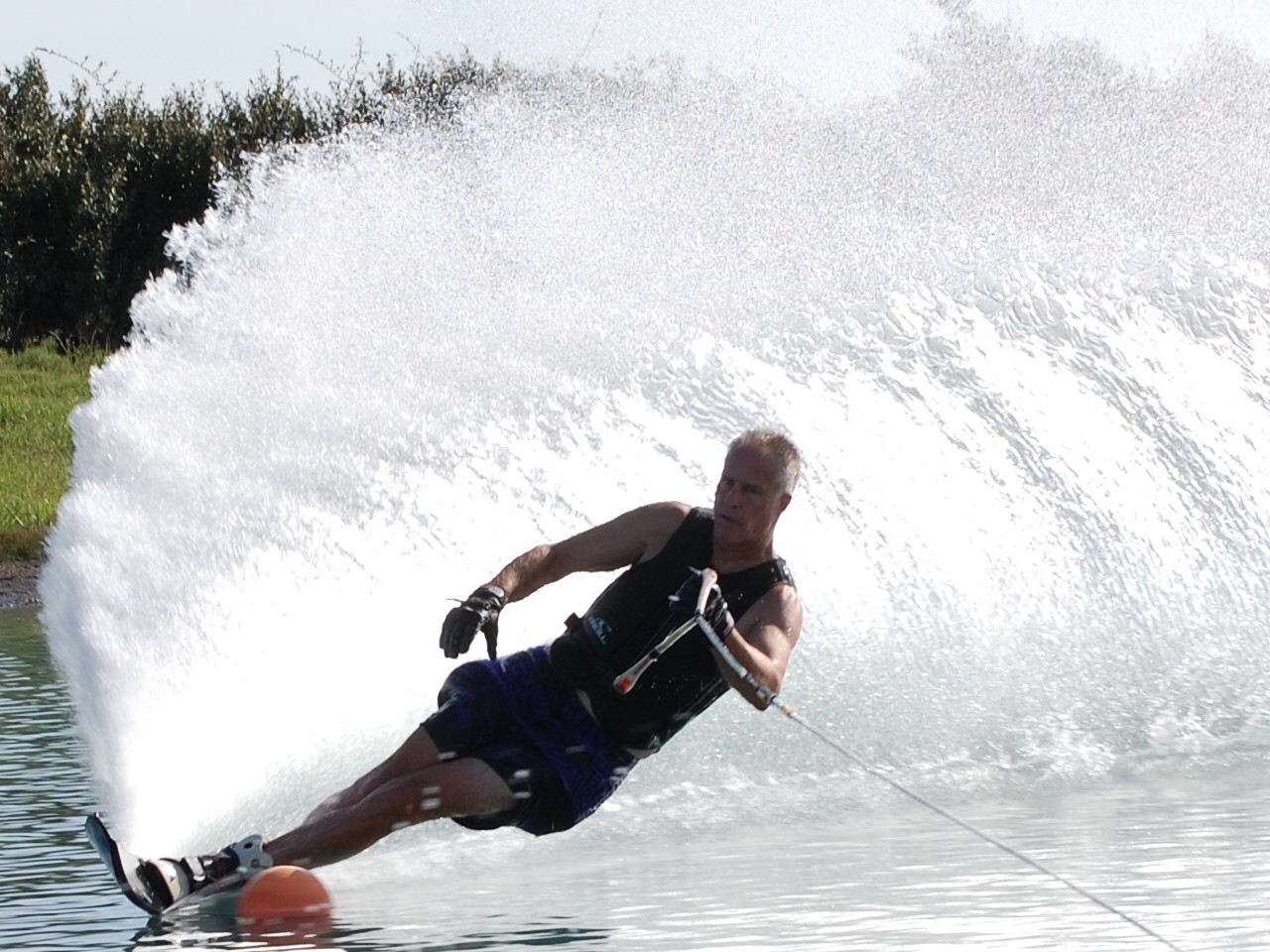
A water-skier making a turn

- Water skiing is a sport where one or more persons is pulled behind a motor boat or a cable ski installation on a body of water wearing one or more skis. Water skiing began in 1922 when Ralph Samuelson used two boards as skis and a clothesline as a tow rope on Lake Pepin in Lake City, Minnesota. The sport remained a little-known activity for several years. Samuelson took stunts on the road, performing shows from Michigan to Florida. In 1966 the American Water Ski Association formally acknowledged Samuelson as the first on record. Samuelson was also the first ski racer, first to go over a jump ramp, first to slalom ski, and the first to put on a water ski show.

1922 Radial arm saw

- A radial arm saw has a circular saw mounted on a sliding horizontal arm. In addition to making length cuts a radial arm saw may be configured with a dado blade to create cuts for dado, rabbet or half lap joints. Some radial arm saws allow the blade to be turned parallel to the back fence allowing a rip cut to be performed. In 1922, Raymond De Walt of Bridgeton, New Jersey, invented the radial arm saw. A patent was applied for in 1923 and awarded to De Walt in 1925.

1922 Audiometer

- An audiometer is a machine used for evaluating hearing loss. Audiometers are standard equipment at ENT clinics and in audiology centers. They usually consist of an embedded hardware unit connected to a pair of headphones and a feedback button, sometimes controlled by a standard PC. The invention of this machine is generally credited to Dr. Harvey Fletcher of Brigham Young University who invented the first audiometer in 1922.

1922 Neutrodyne

- The neutrodyne is a particular type of Tuned Radio Frequency (TRF) radio receiver, in which the instability-causing inter-electrode capacitance of the triode RF tubes is cancelled out or "neutralized". Louis Alan Hazeltine invented and patented the neutrodyne circuit in 1922 while under contract to the U.S. Naval Yard outside Washington, D.C. Hazeltine's invention effectively neutralized the high-pitched squeals that plagued early radio sets.

1923 Bulldozer

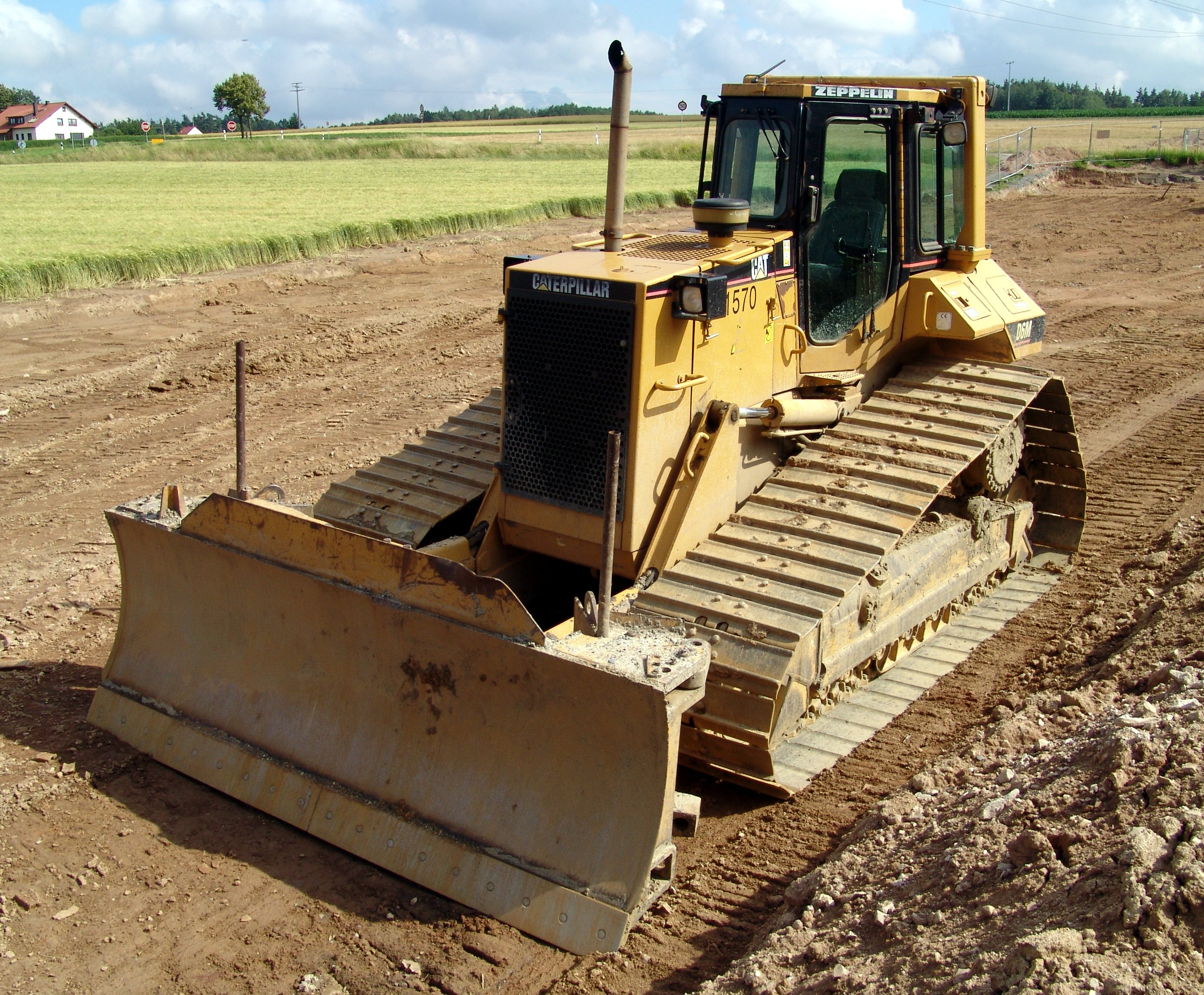
The Caterpillar bulldozer

- A bulldozer is a crawler or a continuous tracked tractor, equipped with a substantial metal plate or blade, used to push large quantities of soil, sand, or rubble during construction work. In 1923, a farmer named James Cummings and a draftsman named J. Earl McLeod co-invented and created the first designs. A replica is on display at the city park in Morrowville, Kansas, where the two built the first bulldozer.

1923 Cotton swab

- Cotton swabs consist of a small wad of cotton wrapped around either one or both ends of a small rod. They are commonly used in a variety of applications including first aid, cosmetics application, for cleaning, and arts & crafts. The cotton swab was invented by Leo Gerstenzang in 1923, who invented the product after attaching wads of cotton to a toothpick. His product, which he named "Baby Gays", went on to become the most widely sold brand name, "Q-tip".

1924 Locking pliers

- Locking pliers, Mole grips or vise-grips are pliers that can be locked into position, using an over-center action. One side of the handle includes a bolt that is used to adjust the spacing of the jaws, the other side of the handle, especially in larger models, often includes a lever to push the two sides of the handles apart to unlock the pliers. William Petersen of DeWitt, Nebraska, invented and patented a primitive version of a wrench in 1921. However, it wasn't until 1924 that the first locking pliers with a locking handle that Petersen called the Vise-Grip was patented.

1924 Cheeseburger

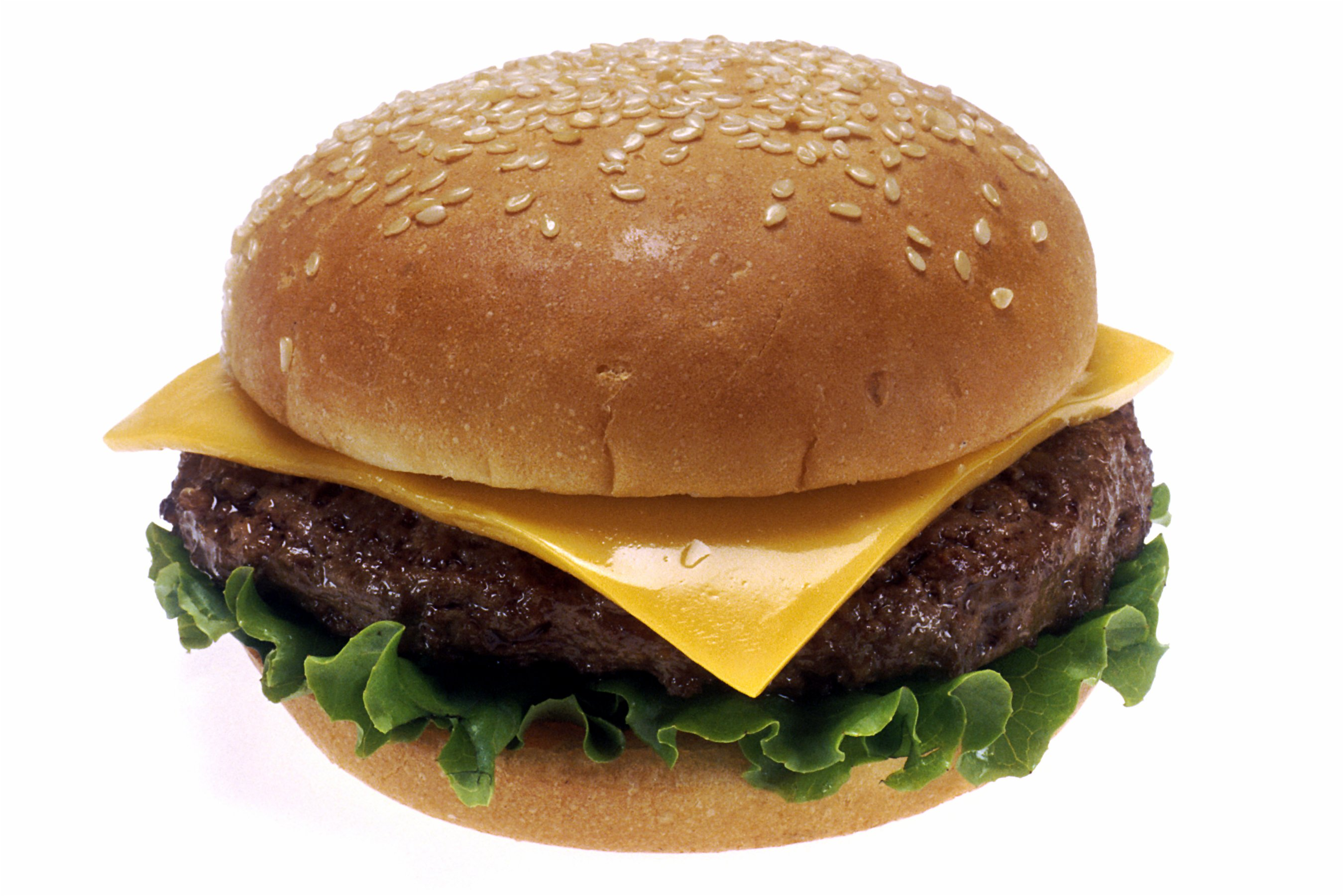
A cheeseburger

- A cheeseburger is a hamburger with cheese added to it. Traditionally the cheese is placed on top of the patty, but the burger can include many variations in structure, ingredients, and composition. The term itself is a portmanteau of the words "cheese" and "hamburger." The cheese is usually sliced, and then added to the cooking hamburger patty shortly before the patty finishes cooking which allows the cheese to melt. Lionel C. Sternberger is believed to have invented the "cheese hamburger" in the 1920s in the Northeast portion of Los Angeles County. The earliest year attributed to the invention of the cheeseburger by Sternberger is in 1924, while others claimed that he invented it as late as 1926. According to American Heritage, "a local restaurateur was identified as the inventor of the cheeseburger at his death in 1964. Cooking at his father's short-order joint in Pasadena in the early 1920s, the lad experimentally tossed a slice (variety unknown) on a hamburger 'and lo! the cheeseburger sizzled to life."

1924 Earth inductor compass

- The Earth inductor compass is a device for determining aircraft direction using the magnetic field of the Earth. The operation of the compass is based on the principle of electromagnetic induction with the Earth's magnetic field acting as the induction field for an electric generator. A variation generated voltage, thus allows the Earth inductor compass to determine direction. The earth inductor compass is an American invention. It was designed in 1924 by Morris Titterington at the Pioneer Instrument Company. Designed to compensate for the weaknesses of the magnetic compass, the Earth inductor compass provided pilots with a more stable and reliable reference instrument.

1924 Gas chamber execution

- A gas chamber is an apparatus for killing, consisting of a sealed chamber into which a toxic gas is introduced. The most commonly used poisonous agent is hydrogen cyanide; carbon dioxide and carbon monoxide have also been used. In an effort to make capital punishment more humane, the State of Nevada introduced death by gas chamber. Convicted murderer John Gee took 6 minutes to die.

1924 Moviola

- A Moviola is a device that allows a film editor to view film while editing. It was the first machine for motion picture editing in order to study individual shots in their cutting rooms that determine where the best cut-point might be. The vertically oriented Moviolas were the standard for film editing in the United States until the 1970s when horizontal flatbed editor systems became more common. In 1924, the Moviola was invented in the United States by Dutch-American Iwan Serrurier.

1924 Radio altimeter

- A radio altimeter measures altitude above the terrain presently beneath an aircraft or spacecraft. This type of altimeter provides the distance between the plane and the ground directly below it, as opposed to a barometric altimeter which provides the distance above a pre-determined datum, usually sea level. In 1924, American engineer Lloyd Espenschied invented the radio altimeter. However, it took 14 years before Bell Labs was able to put Espenschied's device in a form that was adaptable for aircraft use.

1925 Automatic volume control

- Automatic volume control or automatic gain control (AGC) is an adaptive system found in many electronic devices. The average output signal level is fed back to adjust the gain to an appropriate level for a range of input signal levels. In 1925, Harold Alden Wheeler invented the automatic volume control which remains today, a standard feature of AM radio.

1925 Masking tape

- Masking tape is a pressure-sensitive tape made with an easy-to-tear thin paper, and fly back and a removable pressure-sensitive adhesive. In 1925, Richard G. Drew, an employee of the Minnesota Mining and Manufacturing Company (3M), invented the first masking tape, a two-inch-wide tan paper strip backed with a light, pressure-sensitive adhesive. Drew filed U.S. patent #1,760,820 on May 28, 1928, and was issued to him on May 27, 1930.

1925 Reuben sandwich

- A Reuben sandwich is a hot sandwich of layered meat, sauerkraut and Swiss cheese, with a dressing, usually Russian or Thousand Island dressing, that is grilled between slices of rye bread. The origins of the Reuben sandwich is disputed. The earliest claim of inventing the Reuben sandwich comes from Omaha, Nebraska, in 1925 when Ukrainian-American grocer Reuben Kulakofsky fed players in a late-night poker game at the Blackstone Hotel in downtown Omaha. The owner of the hotel was so taken with Reuben's sandwich that he put it on the hotel restaurant menu, designated by its inventor's name. It wasn't until 1956 when a waitress at the Blackstone named Fern Snider entered Reuben's sandwich in a national sandwich competition, one of the earliest documentations given to the name of the sandwich. Another story is that the Reuben sandwich hails from New York City. Arnold Reuben, who opened his deli counter in Manhattan in 1928, has been claimed to have invented the Reuben "eleven years earlier as a sandwich stand in Atlantic City."

1926 Tilt-A-Whirl

- The Tilt-a-Whirl is an amusement ride that consists of seven freely spinning cars, each holding three or four passengers, attached at fixed pivot points on a rotating platform. Designed for commercial use at amusement parks, fairs and carnivals in which it is commonly found, the Tilt-A-Whirl is commonly known for making riders experience nausea. The Tilt-A-Whirl was invented in 1926 by Herbert Sellner, who first operated it at an amusement park in White Bear Lake, Minnesota. More than likely, Sellner discovered its unpredictable dynamics not through mathematical analysis but by building one and trying it out.

1926 Garage door opener

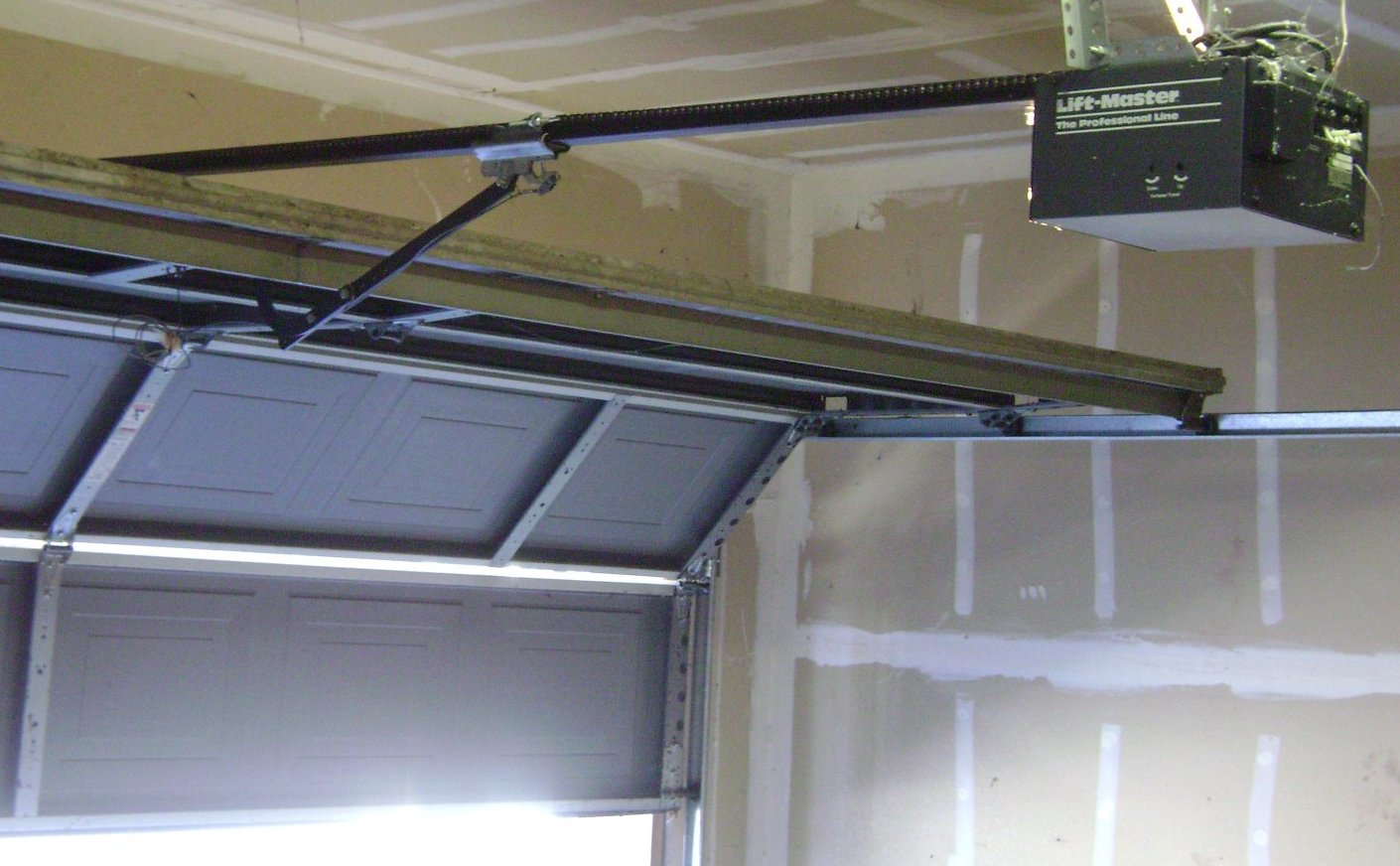
A residential garage door opener. The motor is in the box on the upper right.

- A garage door opener is a motorized device that opens and closes a garage door. Most are controlled by switches on the garage wall, as well as by a remote control carried in the garage owner's vehicle. In 1926, the electric garage door opener was invented by C.G. Johnson, the inventor of the garage door and founder of the Overhead Door Corporation.

1926 Power steering

- Power steering is a system for reducing the steering effort on vehicles by using an external power source to assist in turning the roadwheels. In 1926, Francis W. Davis of Waltham, Massachusetts, invented power steering.

1926 Drive through

- A drive-through, or drive-thru, allows customers to purchase products without leaving their cars. In 1926, City Center Bank, which became UMB Financial Corporation under R. Crosby Kemper opened what is considered the first drive-up window. In-n-Out Burger claims to have built the first drive-through restaurant in 1948. Harry and Esther Snyder, the chain's founders, built their first restaurant in Baldwin Park, California, with a two-way speaker to enable patrons to order directly from their cars without the intermediation of a carhop.

1926 Liquid-fuel rocket

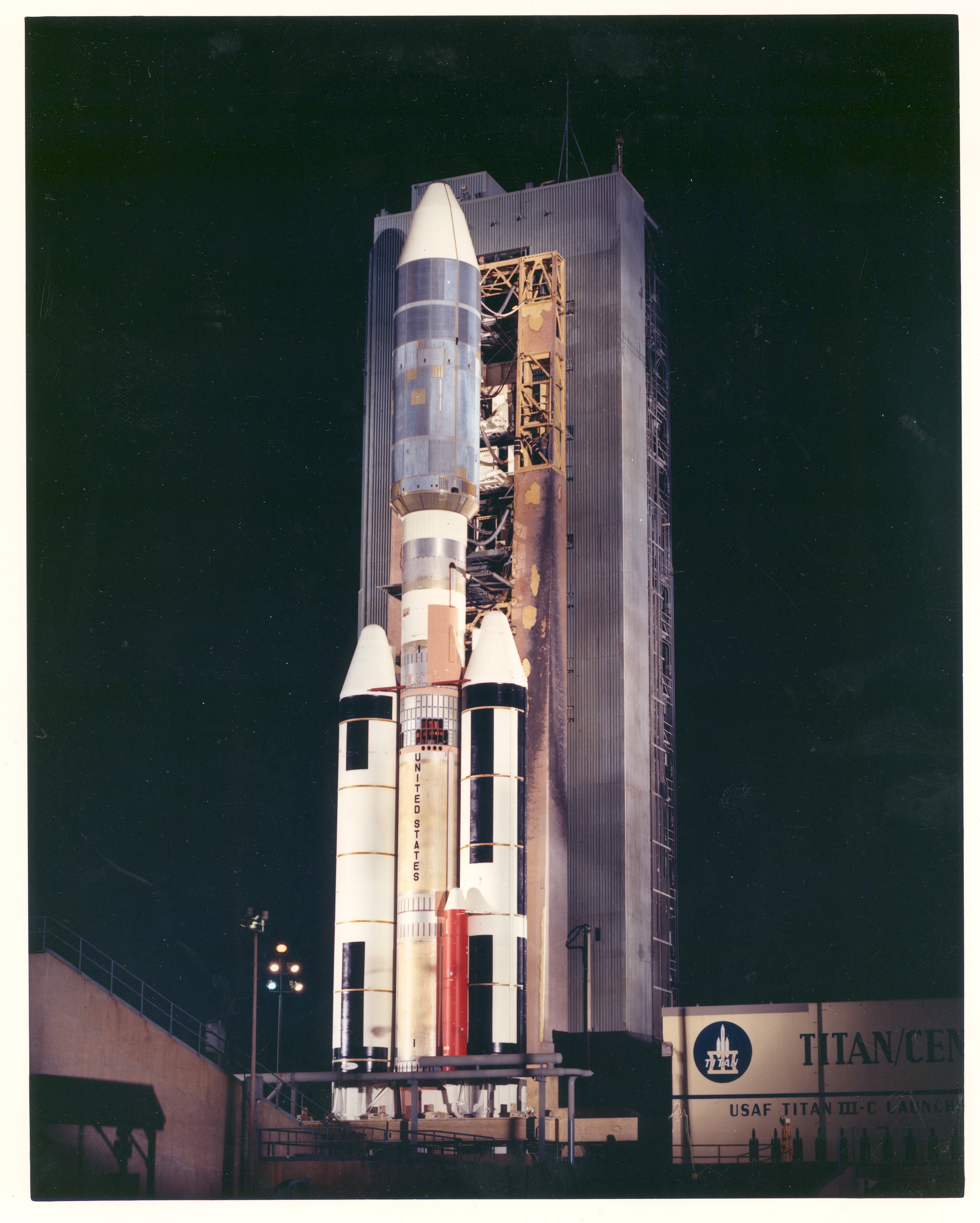
Used during the Viking program, NASA's Titan booster, a two-stage liquid-fueled rocket, was attached to two additional solid-propellant rockets.

- The liquid-fuel rocket is a rocket with an engine that uses propellants in liquid form. On March 16, 1926, in Auburn, Massachusetts, Dr. Robert H. Goddard, the "father of modern rocketry", launched the first liquid-fueled rocket in history, which used liquid oxygen and gasoline as propellants.

1927 Bread slicer

- Sliced bread is a loaf of bread which has been pre-sliced and packaged for commercial convenience. The automatic commercial bread slicer was invented in 1927 by Otto Frederick Rohwedder. His machine both sliced and wrapped a loaf of bread. In 1928, the bread slicer was improved by Gustav Papendick, a baker from St. Louis, Missouri.

1927 Jukebox

- A jukebox is a partially automated music-playing device, usually a coin-operated machine, that can play specially selected songs from self-contained media. The traditional jukebox is rather large with a rounded top and has colored lighting on the front of the machine on its vertical sides. The classic jukebox has buttons with letters and numbers on them that, when combined, are used to indicate a specific song from a particular record. The Automatic Music Instrument Company built and introduced the first electric automated musical instrument which later became known as the jukebox during the 1930s.

1927 Garbage disposal

- A garbage disposal is a device, usually electrically powered, installed under a kitchen sink between the sink's drain and the trap which shreds food waste into pieces small enough to pass through plumbing. The garbage disposal was invented in 1927 by John W. Hammes. After eleven years of development, his InSinkErator company put his disposer on the market in 1968.

1927 Pressure washer

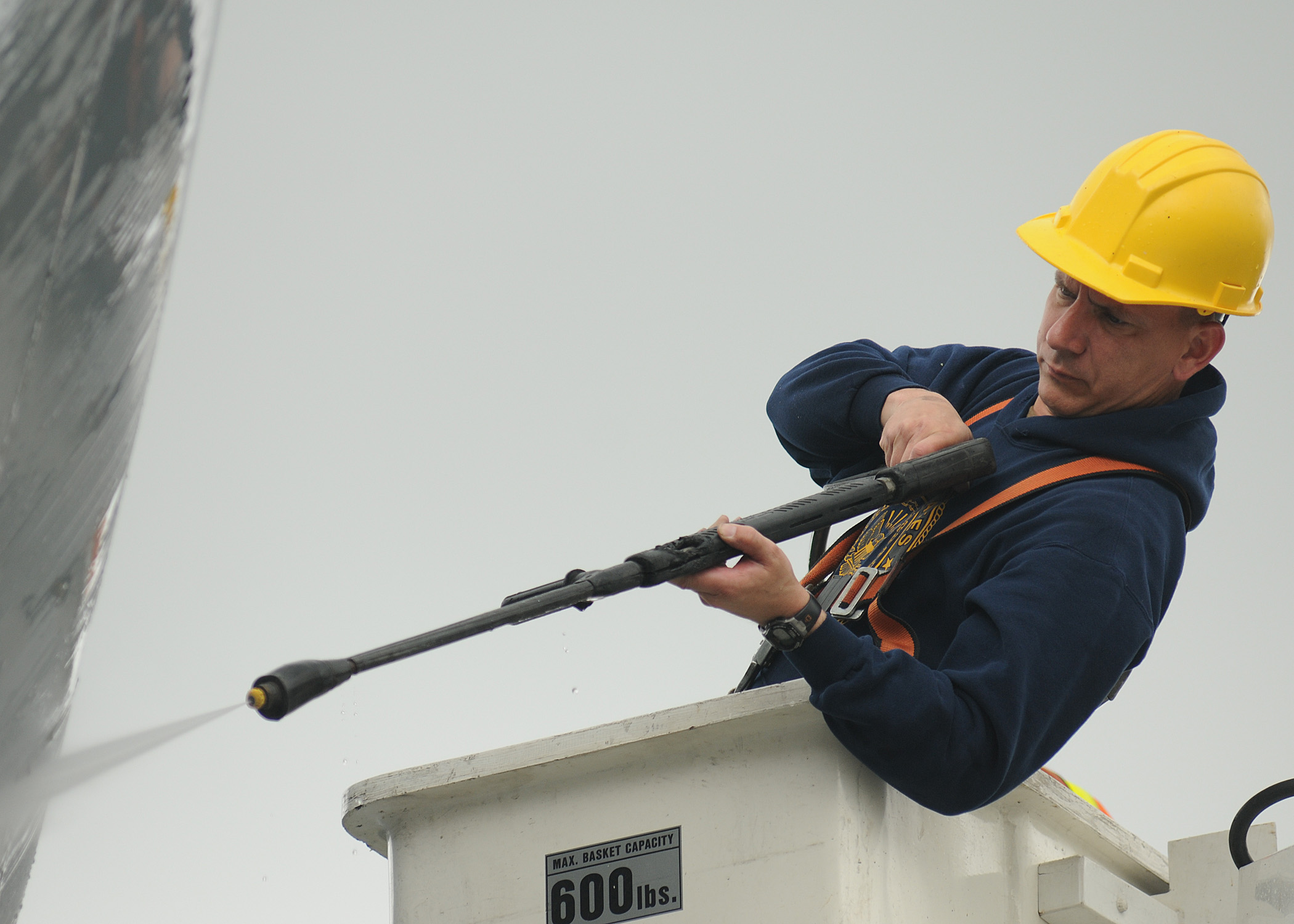
A power washer used to clean the surface of the EA-6B Prowler at Naval Air Station Whidbey Island

- A pressure washer is a high pressure mechanical sprayer that can be used to remove loose paint, mold, grime, dust, mud, and dirt from surfaces and objects such as buildings, vehicles, and concrete road surfaces. Frank Ofeldt in the United States invented the steam pressure washer or "high-pressure Jenny" in 1927.

1927 Resonator guitar

- A resonator guitar or resophonic guitar is an acoustic guitar whose sound is produced by one or more spun metal cones resonators instead of the wooden sound board (guitar top/face). The resonator guitar was invented in 1927 by John Dopyera.

1927 Kool-Aid

- Kool-Aid is a powdered drink mix that comes in an assortment of different flavors. "Kool-Ade" was invented in 1927 by Edwin Perkins in Hastings, Nebraska. Perkins devised a method of removing the liquid from a drink called "Fruit Smack" so the remaining powder could be re-packaged in envelopes, which Perkins designed and printed, all under a new name to be called "Kool-Ade". The name of the powdered drink was later to be changed at a later time to Kool-Aid.

1927 Corn dog

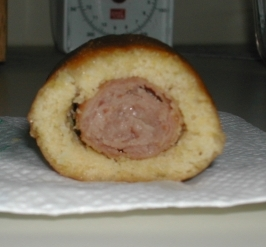
A cross section of a corn dog

- The corn dog, pogo, dagwood dog, pluto pup or corny dog is a hot dog coated in cornbread batter and deep fried in hot oil, although some are baked. Almost all corn dogs are served on wooden sticks, though some early versions were stickless. Although a contending topic as numerous claims of the origins of the corn dog have surfaced, the earliest reference to what resembles a corn dog appeared in U.S. patent 1,706,491 filed in 1927 by Stanley S. Jenkins and issued in 1929. A competing claim to the invention of the corn dog is by George Boyington, the creator of Pronto Pups (made of pancake batter) who in 1938 or 1939, created a "batter-dipped, deep fried hot dog" after a rain storm in Rockaway Beach, Oregon, ruined and made his hot dogs mushy. Another story is that Neil Fletcher supposedly invented corn dogs, first selling them at the Texas State Fair in 1942.

1927 Negative feedback amplifier

- A negative feedback amplifier, or more commonly simply a feedback amplifier, is an amplifier which uses negative feedback to improve performance and reduce sensitivity to parameter variations due to manufacturing or environmental uncertainties. It was invented by Harold Stephen Black in 1927.

1927 Quartz clock

- The quartz clock is a clock that keeps time by using an electronic oscillator regulated by a quartz crystal. This allows for significantly better accuracy than mechanical clocks. The first quartz clock was built in 1927 by Warren Marrison and J.W. Horton at Bell Telephone Laboratories.

1928 Recliner

- A recliner is a reclining armchair. It has a backrest that can be tilted back, causing a footrest to extend from the front. Edward Knabusch and Edwin Shoemaker invented the first recliner in Monroe, Michigan, in 1928 when they modified a wooden porch chair so that the seat moved forward as the back reclined. A padded model was later developed.

1928 Ice cube tray

- An ice cube tray is a tray divided into compartments. It is designed to be filled with water, then placed in a freezer until the water freezes to ice, producing ice cubes. The first flexible ice cube tray was invented by Lloyd Groff Copeman in 1928.

1928 Bubble gum

- Bubblegum is a type of chewing gum especially designed for blowing bubbles. Bubblegum was invented by Frank Henry Fleer in 1906, but was not successful; the formulation of Fleer's "Blibber-Blubber", was too sticky. In 1928, Walter E. Diemer invented a superior formulation for bubble gum, which he called " Double Bubble."

1928 Clip-on tie

- The clip-on tie is a bow tie or four-in-hand tie which is permanently tied, with a dimple just below the knot, and which is fixed to the front of the shirt collar by a metal clip. Alternately, the tie may have a band around the neck fastened with a hook and eye. The clip-on tie was reportedly invented on December 13, 1928, in Clinton, Iowa. The name of the inventor remains unknown.

1928 Electric razor

- The electric razor has a rotating, vibrating or oscillating blade to remove unwanted hair. The electric razor does not require the use of shaving cream, soap, or water. The razor is powered by a small DC motor, and usually has rechargeable batteries, though early ones were powered directly by house current. The electric razor was invented in 1928 by Col. Jacob Schick.

1928 Iron lung

- An iron lung is a large machine that enables a person to breathe when normal muscle control has been lost or the work of breathing exceeds the person's ability. It is a form of a medical ventilator. Philip Drinker invented the iron lung while working at Harvard University in 1928.

== Great Depression and World War II (1929–1945) ==
1929 Freon

- Freon is an odorless, colorless, nonflammable, and noncorrosive chlorofluorocarbon and hydrochlorofluorocarbon refrigerant, which is used in air conditioning, refrigeration and some automatic fire-fighting systems. Refrigerators from the late 19th century until 1929 used toxic gases, ammonia, methyl chloride, and sulfur dioxide as refrigerants. This new "miracle compound" was co-invented in 1929 by Charles Midgley Jr. and Charles Kettering.

1929 Tampon (applicator)

- A tampon is a mass of absorbent material into a body cavity or wound to absorb bodily fluid. The most common type in daily use is disposable and designed to be inserted into the vagina during menstruation to absorb the flow of blood. The ancient Egyptians first invented disposable tampons made of softened papyrus around 2500 B.C. The ancient Greeks followed this with tampons made from lint wrapped around a small piece of wood. But it was not until 1929 that Earle Haas of Denver first invented the modern tampon with an applicator. Dr. Haas submitted the design for patent in 1931, and in 1936, the tampon was first sold in the United States. He later gave his invention the brandname Tampax, which is still one of the main tampon brands today.

1929 Eyelash curler

- An eyelash curler is a hand-operated mechanical device for curling eyelashes for cosmetic purposes. The earliest patent for an eyelash curler was filed on August 15, 1929, and issued to William E. McDonell and Charles W. Stickel of Rochester, New York, on April 7, 1931.

1929 Sunglasses

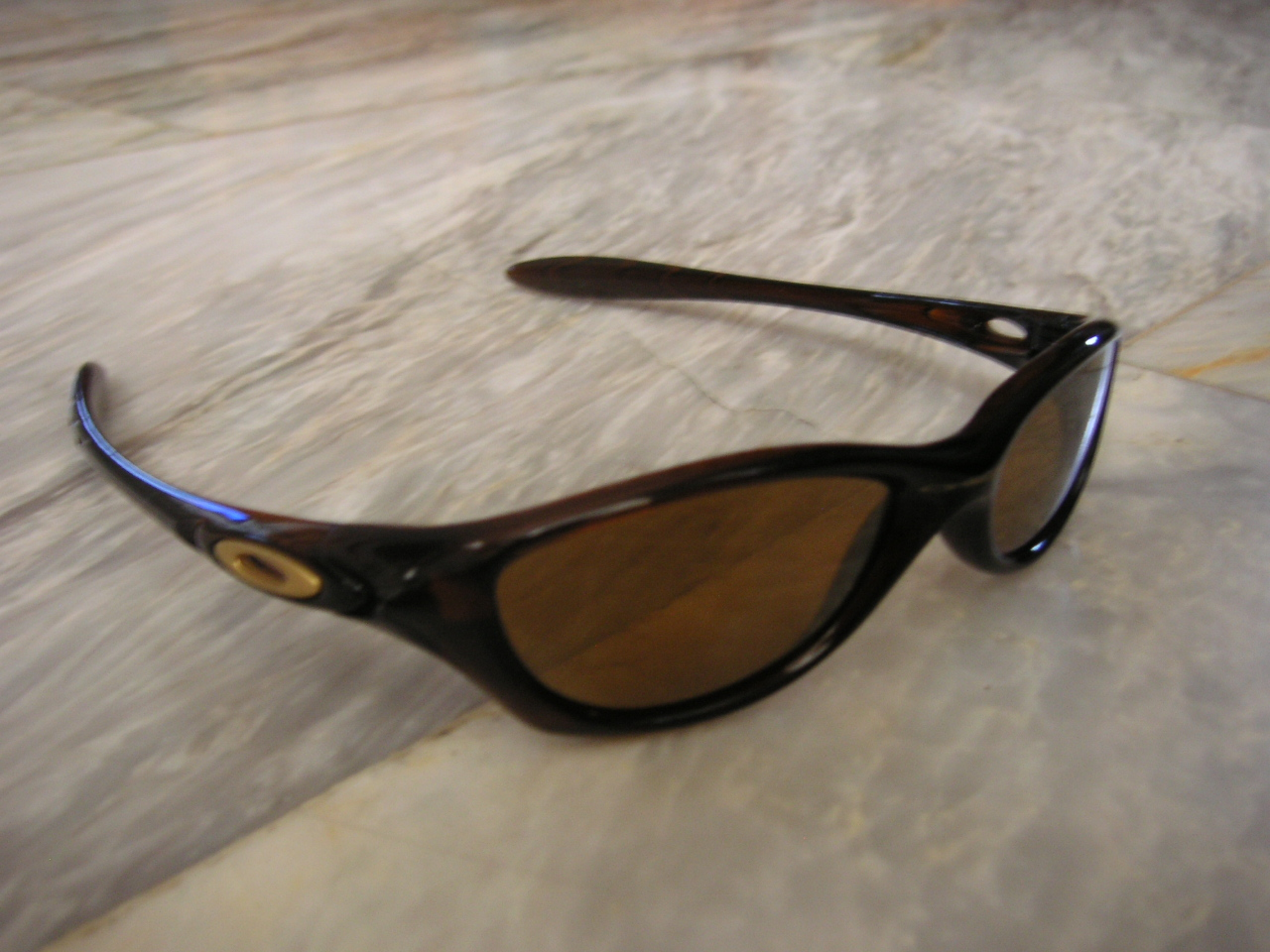
A pair of sunglasses for women

- Sunglasses or sun glasses are a visual aid which feature lenses that are coloured or darkened to prevent strong light from reaching the eyes. For centuries, Chinese judges had routinely worn smoke-colored quartz lenses to conceal their eye expressions in court. However, these were not intended for blocking sunlight from eyes. It wasn't until the 20th century that what is now considered to be sunglasses were invented. In 1929, Sam Foster invented and mass-produced the first tinted eyewear pieces solely intended to block out sunlight.

1929 Frozen food

- Frozen food is food preserved by the process of freezing. Freezing food is a common method of food preservation which slows both food decay and, by turning water to ice, makes it unavailable for most bacterial growth and slows down most chemical reactions. Clarence Birdseye offered his quick-frozen foods to the public. Birdseye got the idea during fur-trapping expeditions to Labrador in 1912 and 1916, where he saw the natives use freezing to preserve foods.

1929 Cyclotron

- A cyclotron is a type of particle accelerator that accelerate charged particles using a high-frequency, alternating voltage. The cyclotron was invented in 1929 by Ernest O. Lawrence at the University of California at Berkeley.

1930 Tiltrotor

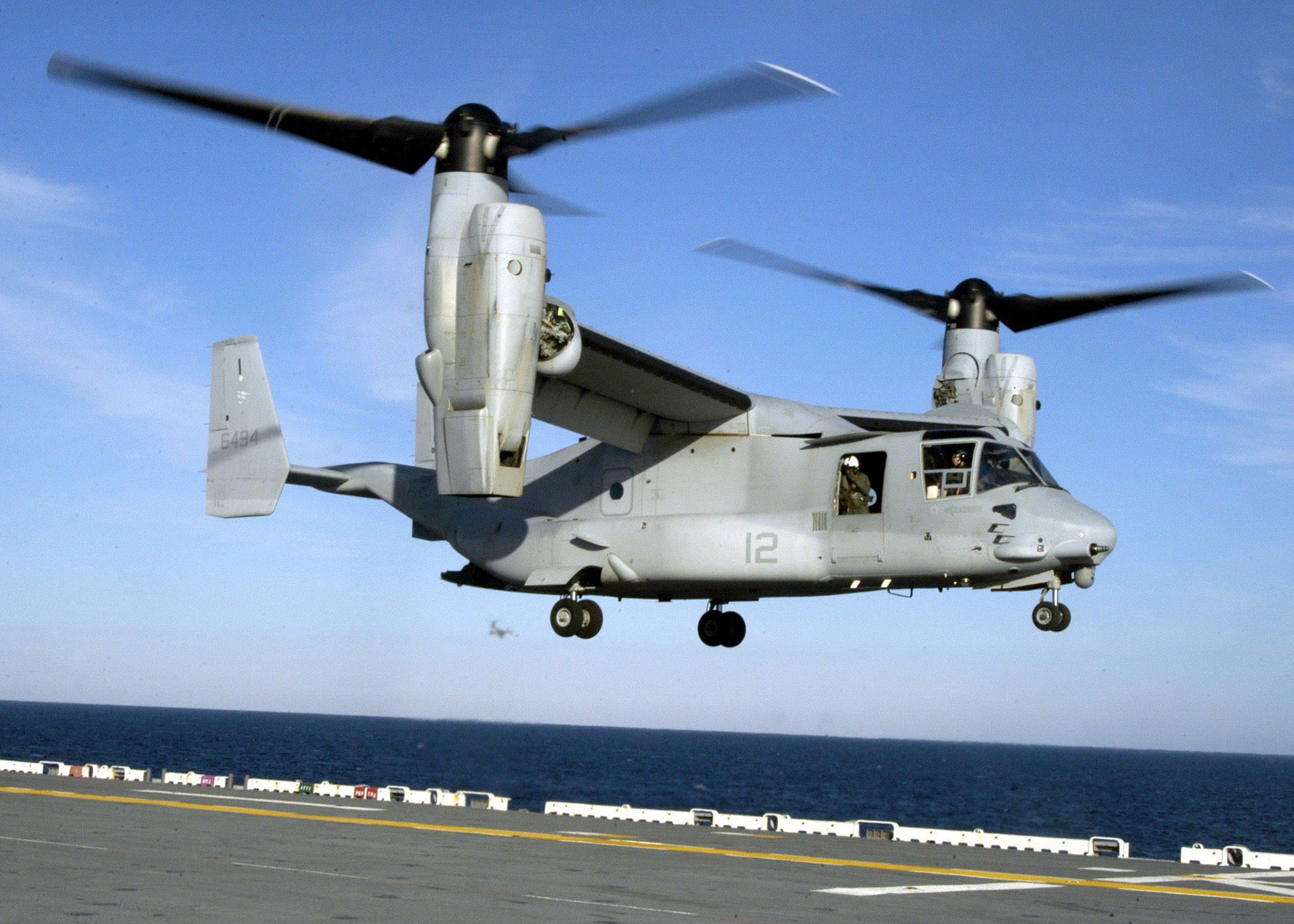
An example of a tiltrotor in operation, the Bell Boeing V-22 Osprey

- A tiltrotor is an aircraft which uses a pair or more of powered rotors (sometimes called proprotors) mounted on rotating shafts or nacelles at the end of a fixed wing for lift and propulsion, and combines the vertical lift capability of a helicopter with the speed and range of a conventional fixed-wing aircraft. In September 1930, George Lehberger devised the basic concept of tilt rotor aircraft, that is, a relatively low disc loading thruster (propeller) that can tilt its axis from the vertical (for vertical lift) to the horizontal (for propulsive thrust). On September 16, 1930, Lehberger was issued U.S. patent #1,775,861.

1930 Car audio

- Car audio/video (car AV) is a sound or video system fitted in an automobile. In 1930, the Galvin Corporation introduced the first commercial car radio, the Motorola model 5T71, which sold for between $110 and $130 and could be installed in most popular automobiles. Inventors Paul Galvin and Joe Galvin came up with the name Motorola when their company started manufacturing car radios.

1930 Cheesesteak

- A cheesesteak, or a Philly cheesesteak, is a long, crusty roll filled with thinly sliced sautéed ribeye beef and melted cheese. Generally, the cheese of choice is Cheez Whiz, but American and provolone are common substitutions. The art of cheesesteak preparation lies in the balance of flavors, textures and what is often referred to as the "drip" factor. Other toppings may include fried onions, sautéed mushrooms, ketchup and hot or sweet peppers. The cheesesteak was invented in 1930 by Philadelphian hot dog vendor Pat Olivieri who one day decided to substitute beef instead of a hot dog in a hoagie bun. A taxicab driver noticed the alluring aroma and asked for his own sandwich. Through word of mouth, Olivieri's sandwiches the following day were highly sought after by taxi cab drivers around Philadelphia. Due to booming business, Olivieri soon opened up his own shop, Pat's King of Steaks on 9th Street and Passyunk Avenue. Eventually, according to legend, he added cheese to the steak. The cheesesteak is considered to be a cultural icon of the city of Philadelphia.

1930 Bathysphere

- A bathysphere is a pressurized metal sphere that allows people to go deep in the ocean, to depths at which diving unaided is impossible. This hollow cast iron sphere with very thick walls is lowered and raised from a ship using a steel cable. The bathysphere was invented by William Beebe and Otis Barton in 1930. William Beebe, an American naturalist and undersea explorer, tested the bathysphere in 1930, going down to 1,426 feet (435 m) in a 4 ft 9 in (1.45 m) diameter bathysphere. Beebe and Otis Barton descended about 3,000 ft (910 m) in a larger bathysphere in 1934. They descended off the coast of Nonsuch Island, Bermuda in the Atlantic Ocean. During the dive, they communicated with the surface via telephone.

1930 Chocolate chip cookie

- A chocolate chip cookie is a drop cookie which features chocolate chips as its distinguishing ingredient. The traditional recipe combines a dough composed of butter and both brown and white sugar with semi-sweet chocolate chips. Ruth Wakefield of Whitman, Massachusetts, invented chocolate chips and chocolate chip cookies in 1930. Her new cookie invention was called the "Toll House Cookie" which used broken-up bars of semi-sweet chocolate.

1930 Thermistor

- A thermistor is a type of resistor with electrical resistance inversely proportional to its temperature. The word is a portmanteau of thermal and resistor. The thermosistor was invented by Samuel Ruben in 1930.

1931 Electric guitar

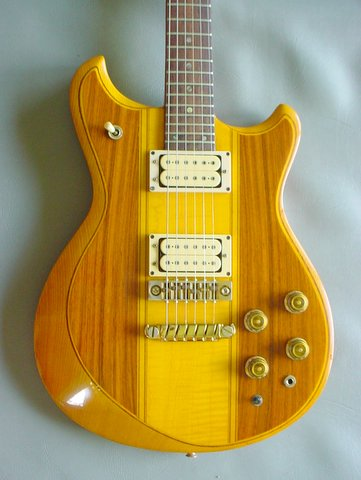
Body of an electric guitar

- An electric guitar is a guitar using pickups to convert its metal string vibration into electricity. This is amplified with an instrument amplifier. The output is altered with guitar effects such as reverb or distortion. The earliest electric guitar, known as a "frying pan", was a hollow bodied acoustic instrument with tungsten steel pickups invented by George Beauchamp and Adolph Rickenbacker in 1931. The electric guitar was a key instrument in the development of musical styles that emerged since the late 1940s, such as Chicago blues, early rock and roll, rockabilly, and 1960s blues rock. Electric guitars are used in almost every popular music genre. U.S. patent #2,089,171 was filed by Beauchamp on June 2, 1934, and issued on August 10 1937.

1931 Strobe light

- The strobe light, commonly called a strobe, is a device used to produce regular flashes of light. Modern uses of strobe lights serve a purpose for safety warning, and motion detection. Strobes can be found atop most police cars, ambulances, and fire trucks. The origin of strobe lighting dates to 1931, when Harold Eugene Edgerton invented a flashing lamp to make an improved stroboscope for the study of moving objects, eventually resulting in dramatic photographs of objects such as bullets in flight.

1931 Aerogel

- Aerogel is a low-density solid-state material derived from gel in which the liquid component of the gel has been replaced with gas. The result is an extremely low-density solid with several remarkable properties, most notably its effectiveness as a thermal insulator. It was first invented by Samuel Stephens Kistler in 1931, as a result of a bet with Charles Learned over who could replace the liquid inside of a Fruit preserves jar with gas without causing shrinkage.

1931 Bug zapper

- A bug zapper is a device that attracts and kills insects that are attracted by light. A light source attracts insects to an electrical grid, where they are electrocuted by touching two wires with a high voltage between them. The earliest bug zappers appear as early as 1911. However, the first bug zapper patented was by Harrison L. Chapin and William F. Folmer who filed on September 23, 1931, and received U.S. patent #1,962,439 on June 12, 1934.

1932 Miniature snap-action switch

- A miniature snap-action switch, also trademarked and frequently known as a micro switch, is an electric switch that is actuated by very little physical force, through the use of a tipping-point mechanism, sometimes called an "over-center" mechanism. Common applications of micro switches include the door interlock on a microwave oven, levelling and safety switches in elevators, vending machines, and to detect paper jams or other faults in photocopiers. The miniature snap-action switch was invented in 1932 by Peter McGall, who was an employee of the Burgess Battery Company in Freeport, Illinois.

1932 Toilet brush

- A toilet brush is a domestic implement designed for the cleaning of the lavatory pan. The modern plastic version was invented by William C. Schopp of Huntington Park, California, USA. U.S. patent #1,927,350 was submitted on March 24, 1932, and issued on September 19, 1933.

1932 Golf cart

- A golf cart or golf buggy is a small vehicle designed originally to carry two golfers and their golf clubs around a golf course. The earliest known golf cart was an electric one, built in California around the year 1932 by an unnamed golfer who was physically unable to walk to all 18 holes on a golf course. However, it was Merle Williams of Long Beach, California, who in 1951, introduced golf carts to the public.

1932 Staple remover

- A staple remover allows for the quick removal of a staple from a material without causing damage. The form of destapler described was invented by William G. Pankonin of Chicago, Illinois. A patent application for the same was filed on December 12, 1932, granted on March 3, 1936, and published on April 3, 1936, as a patent.

1932 Radio telescope

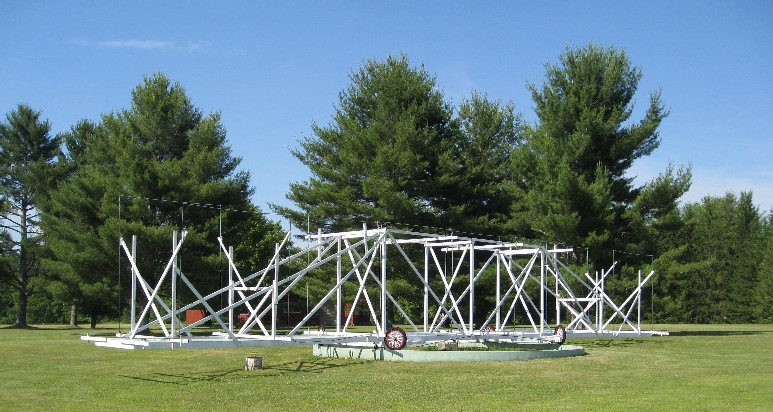
Full-size replica of Jansky's directional radio antenna, serendipitously the first radio telescope

- A radio telescope is a form of directional radio antenna used in radio astronomy. They differ from optical telescopes in that they operate in the radio frequency portion of the electromagnetic spectrum where they can detect and collect data on radio sources. Radio telescopes are typically large parabolic or dish antenna used singularly or in an array. Karl Guthe Jansky started the field of radio astronomy serendipitous in 1932 when his directional antenna found radio static that he later identified as coming from the Milky Way.

1932 Tape dispenser

- A tape dispenser holds a roll of tape and has a mechanism on one end to easily shear the tape. Dispensers vary widely based on the tape they dispense. Clear tape dispensers are commonly made of plastic, and may be disposable. Other dispensers are stationary and may have sophisticated features to control tape usage and improve ergonomics. The first tape dispenser with a built-in cutting edge was invented in 1932 by John A. Borden, another 3M employee.

1933 Landing Vehicle Tracked

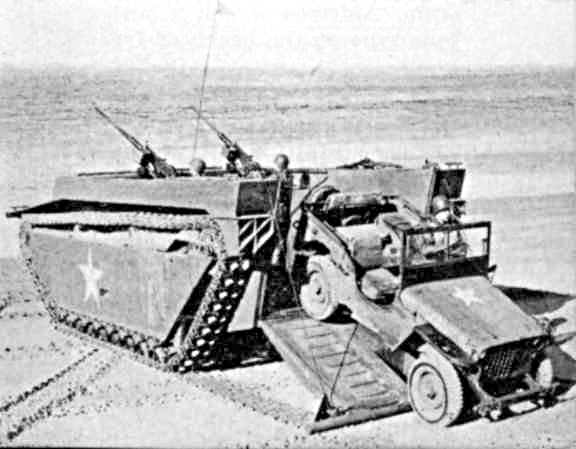
A Landing Vehicle Tracked (LVT) Mark III unloading a Willys MB jeep during World War II

- A Landing Vehicle Tracked (LVT), also known as amtracks, alligators, or Buffaloes, were amphibious tracked vehicles capable of crawling out of the water and onto the beach and beyond. Used primarily by the United States Armed Forces in the Pacific War against the Empire of Japan during World War II, later versions were thinly armored, and some were equipped with a light tank turret to provide fire support, making them equivalent to light amphibious tanks. Highly versatile in their use, LVT's landed supplies ashore at Guadalcanal and soldiers ashore at Tarawa, other variations of the LVT were equipped with flamethrowers during the Peleliu Campaign. The LVT was derived from the Alligator, an amphibious vehicle invented by Donald Roebling in 1933 as a rescue vehicle for downed aviators in the Florida Everglades.

1933 Multiplane camera

- The multiplane camera is a special motion picture camera used in the traditional animation process that moves a number of pieces of artwork past the camera at various speeds and at various distances from one another, creating a three-dimensional effect, although not stereoscopic. Various parts of the artwork layers are left transparent, to allow other layers to be seen behind them. The movements are calculated and photographed frame-by-frame, with the result being an illusion of depth by having several layers of artwork moving at different speeds. The further away from the camera, the slower the speed. The multiplane effect is sometimes referred to as a parallax process. As a former director and animator of Walt Disney Studios, Ub Iwerks in 1933 invented the multiplane camera using four layers of flat artwork before a horizontal camera.

1933 Frequency modulation

- In telecommunications, frequency modulation (FM) conveys information over a carrier wave by varying its frequency. While working in the basement laboratory of Columbia's Philosophy Hall, Edwin Armstrong invented wide-band frequency modulation radio in 1933. Rather than varying the amplitude of a radio wave to create sound, Armstrong's method varied the frequency of the wave instead. FM radio broadcasts delivered a much clearer sound, free of static, than the AM radio dominant at the time. Armstrong received a patent on wideband FM on December 26, 1933.

1933 Impact sprinkler

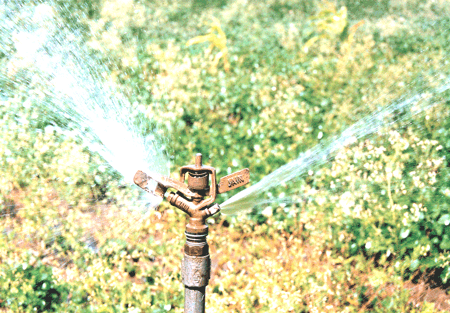
A full impact sprinkler watering a lawn

- An impact sprinkler is a type of irrigation sprinkler that pivots on a bearing on top of its threaded attachment nut, and is driven in a circular motion by a spring-loaded arm that is pushed back by the water stream, then returning to "impact" the stream. This produces an intermittent diffusion of the stream that provides a uniform waterfall closer to the sprinkler. In 1933, the impact sprinkler was invented and patented by lemon tree grower and farmer Orton Englehardt of Glendora, California.

1934 Trampoline (modern)

- A trampoline is a gymnastic and recreational device consisting of a piece of taut, strong fabric stretched over a steel frame using many coiled springs to provide a rebounding force which propels the jumper high into the air. In a trampoline, the fabric is not elastic itself; the elasticity is provided by the springs which connect it to the frame. While the trampoline is an old invention which relied on crude and flawed designs, the modern trampoline was invented by George Nissen and Larry Griswold around 1934.

1934 Acrostic (puzzle)

- An acrostic is a type of word puzzle, related somewhat to crossword puzzles, that uses an acrostic form with lettered clues and numbered blanks. The acrostic puzzle was invented in 1934 by Elizabeth Kingsley, first appearing in the March 31 edition of the Saturday Evening Post.

1935 Richter magnitude scale

- The Richter magnitude scale, or local magnitude M_{L} scale, assigns a number to quantify the amount of seismic energy released by an earthquake. It is a base-10 logarithmic scale obtained by calculating the logarithm of the combined horizontal amplitude of the largest displacement from zero on a Wood–Anderson torsion seismometer output. Co-invented in 1935 by Charles Richter along with Beno Gutenberg of the California Institute of Technology, the Richter magnitude scale was firstly intended to be used only in a particular study area in California, and on seismograms recorded on a particular instrument, the Wood-Anderson torsion seismometer.

1935 Black light

- A black light or UV Light is a lamp emitting electromagnetic radiation that is almost exclusively in the soft ultraviolet range, and emits little visible light. The black light was invented by William H. Byler, in 1935. Prior to that blacklight was produced by filtering light from a conventional bulb by Wood's Glass

1935 Parking meter

- A parking meter is a device used to collect money in exchange for the right to park a vehicle in a particular place for a limited amount of time. The parking meter was invented by Carl C. Magee of Oklahoma City, Oklahoma, in 1935. Magee also holds the patent for a "coin controlled parking meter", filed on May 13, 1935, and issued on May 24, 1938.

1935 Surfboard fin

- The surfboard fin, or keel, is the part of the back of a surfboard that enters the water. Similar to a rudder on a boat the surfboard fin works to steer the board and provide stability. The surfboard fin prevents a surfer from uncontrollably spinning in circles while trying to ride a wave. The surfboard fin was invented by Tom Blake in 1935.

1935 pH meter

- A pH meter is an electronic instrument used to measure the pH (acidity or alkalinity) of a liquid. While electrodes were used to measure pH in the 1920s, in 1935 Arnold Orville Beckman invented the complete pH meter.

1935 Gomco clamp

- A Gomco clamp, otherwise known as a Yellen clamp, is a specialized clamp for performing circumcisions on a human male's penis. By using a Gomco clampe, the time required is less than that by any other method, sutures are never used, no bleeding is encountered, and it leaves a clean-cut incision which heals perfectly in 36 hours with practically no chance of infection because the mucous membrane and skin are securely clamped together. The Gomco clamp was invented in 1935 by Hiram S. Yellen and Aaron Goldstein. The Gomco clamp was then marketed by Goldstein through his private company, the Goldstein Manufacturing Company and later patented in 1940.

1936 Reed switch

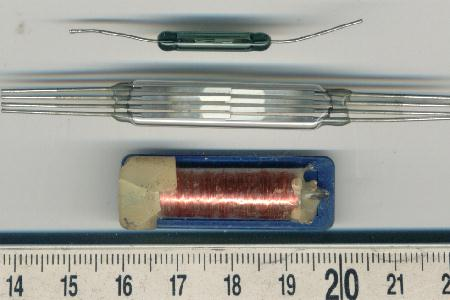
Examples of reed relays and switches

- A reed switch is an electrical switch consisting of two ferromagnetic and specially shaped contact blades (reeds) positioned in a hermetically sealed glass tube with a gap between them and in a protective atmosphere. Operated by an applied magnetic field, reed switches are used as reed relays, automotive sensors, robotics sensors, security sensors and are found in many toys and games. The reed switch was invented in 1936 by W. B. Elwood at Bell Telephone Laboratories.

1936 Phillips-head screw

The Phillips-head screw is a crosshead screw design lying in its self-centering property, useful on automated production lines that use power screwdrivers. The Phillips-head screw was invented and patented by Henry F. Phillips in 1936.

1936 Stock car racing

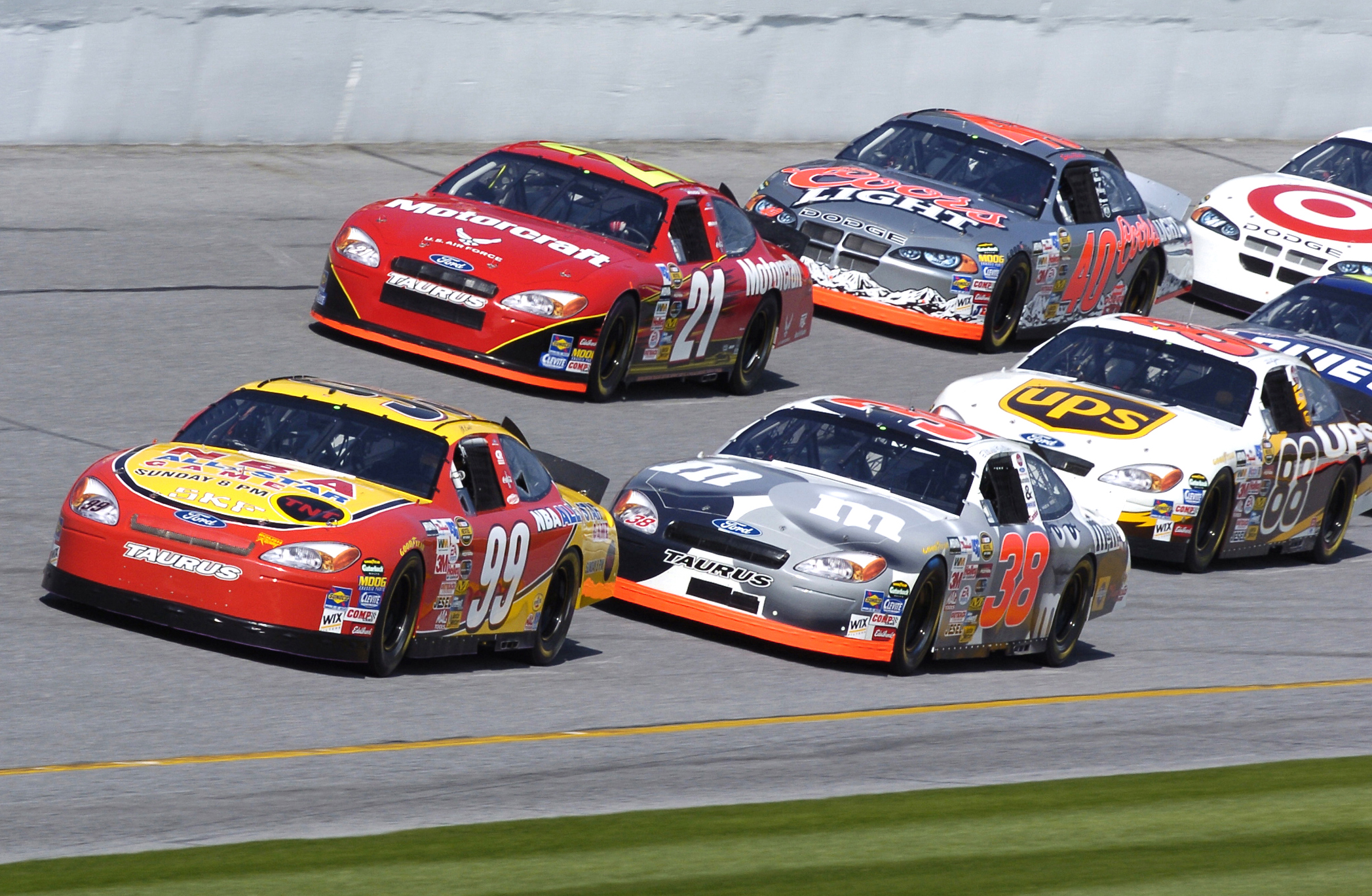
The world-famous Daytona 500

- Stock car racing is a form of automobile racing. Shorter ovals are called short tracks, unpaved short tracks are called dirt tracks, and longer ovals are known as superspeedways. On March 8, 1936, the first stock car race was held on the Daytona Beach Road Course, promoted by local racer Sig Haugdahl. The race was 78 laps (250 miles) long for street-legal family sedans sanctioned by the American Automobile Association (AAA) for cars built in 1935 and 1936. The city posted a $5000 purse with $1700 for the winner. In 1948, stock car racing became a regulated sport when Bill France Sr. created NASCAR.

1936 Programming languages

- A programming language is a machine-readable artificial language. Programming languages can be used to create programs that specify the behavior of a machine, to express algorithms precisely, or as a mode of human communication. The first programming languages predate the modern computer. In mathematical logic and computer science, lambda calculus, also written as λ-calculus, is a formal system designed to investigate function definition, function application and recursion. It was invented by Alonzo Church and Stephen Cole Kleene in the 1930s as part of an investigation into the foundations of mathematics, but has now emerged as a useful tool in the investigation of problems in computability, recursion theory, and as a fundamental basis and a modern paradigm to computer programming and software languages.

1936 Compact fluorescent lamp

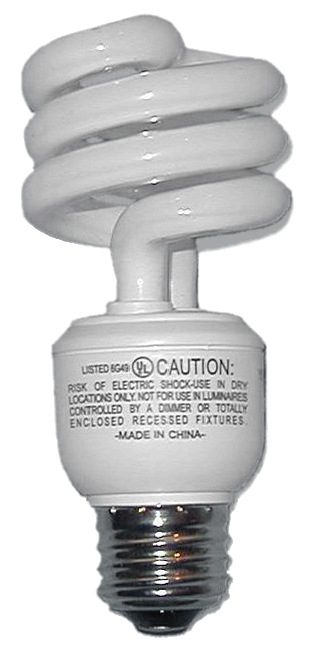
An example of a spiraled compact fluorescent lamp invented in 1976 by Edward Hammer

- A compact fluorescent lamp is a fluorescent lamp designed to replace an incandescent lightbulb. Some CFL's fit into light fixtures formerly used for incandescent lamps and they are designed to produce the same amount of visible light found in incandescent light. CFLs generally use 70% less energy and have a longer rated life. In 1941, George Inman devised the first practical fluorescent lamp while working for General Electric. The key patent for this light source, U.S. patent #2,259,040 was filed by Inman on April 22, 1936, and issued to him on October 14, 1941. In 1976, Edward E. Hammer invented the first helical or spiraled compact fluorescent lamp, but due to the difficulty of the manufacturing process for coating the interior of the spiral glass tube, General Electric did not manufacture or sell the device. Other companies began manufacturing and selling the device in 1995.

1936 Chair lift

- A chair lift is a type of aerial lift, which consists of a continuously circulating steel cable loop strung between two end terminals and usually over intermediate towers, carrying a series of chairs. They are the primary onhill transport at most ski areas, but are also found at amusement parks, various tourist attractions, and increasingly, in urban transport. James Curran, an engineer from the Union Pacific Railroad, invented and built the first chair lift in the world. Known as the Proctor Mountain Ski Lift, it was located in Sun Valley, Idaho.

1936 Strain gauge

- A strain gauge is a device used to measure the strain of an object. As the object is deformed, the foil is deformed, causing its electrical resistance to change. The strain gauge was invented in 1936 by Edward E. Simmons, a professor at the California Institute of Technology, and re-invented in 1938 by Arthur C. Ruge, an earthquake specialist at the Massachusetts Institute of Technology.

1936 Bass guitar

- The bass guitar is a stringed instrument played primarily with the fingers or thumb (either by plucking, slapping, popping, tapping, or thumping), or by using a plectrum. The bass guitar is similar in appearance and construction to an electric guitar, but with a longer neck and scale length, and four, five, or six strings. In 1936, the Audiovox bass, the earliest electric solid-body bass guitar made out of walnut and neck-through construction, was invented by Paul Tutmarc of Seattle, Washington. Later in 1951, the bass guitar was perfected when Leo Fender introduced the Precision Bass, a fretted, solid-body instrument.

1937 O-ring

- An O-ring, also known as a toric joint, is a mechanical gasket in the shape of a torus containing a loop of elastomer with a disc-shaped cross-section. It is designed to be seated in a groove and compressed during assembly between two or more parts, creating a seal at the interface. The O-ring was invented in 1937 by Danish-American machinist Niels Christensen.

1937 Photosensitive glass

- Photosensitive glass is a clear glass in which microscopic metallic particles can be formed into a picture or image by exposure to short wave radiations such as ultraviolet light. Photosensitive glass was invented in November 1937 by S. Donald Stookey of Corning Glass Works.

1937 Digital computer

- A digital computer is a device capable of solving problems by processing information on discrete form. It operates on data, including magnitudes, letters, and symbols that are expressed in binary form. While working at Bell Labs in November 1937, George Stibitz, who is internationally recognized as one of the fathers of the modern digital computer, built the world's first relay-based 2-bit binary Adder circuit.

1937 Shopping cart

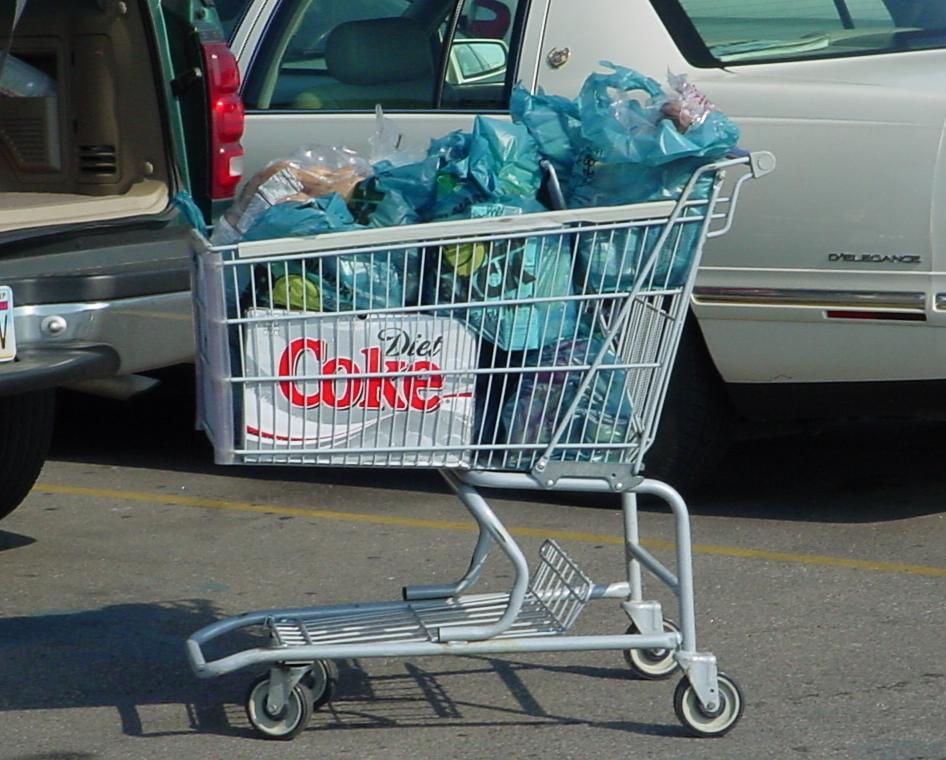
A shopping cart filled with bagged groceries located in a parking lot

- A shopping cart is a metal or plastic basket on wheels supplied by a shop, especially a supermarket, for use by customers inside the shop for transport of merchandise to the check-out counter during shopping. Often, customers are allowed to leave the carts in the parking lot, and store personnel return the carts to the shop. The first shopping cart was invented by Sylvan Goldman in 1937, owner of the Humpty Dumpty supermarket chain in Oklahoma City.

1937 Sunglasses (polarized)

- Polarized sunglasses are protective eyewear which incorporate oscillated lenses shifting the sun's rays in the opposite direction. Polarized sunglasses were invented in 1937 by Edwin Land.

1937 Klystron

- A klystron is a specialized linear-beam vacuum tube. Klystrons are used as amplifiers at microwave and radio frequencies to produce both low-power reference signals for superheterodyne radar receivers and to produce high-power carrier waves for communications and the driving force for modern particle accelerator. Russell and Sigurd Varian of Stanford University are generally considered to be the inventors. Their prototype was completed in August 1937.

1937 Cyclamate

- Cyclamate is an artificial sweetener 30–50 times sweeter than sugar, making it the least potent of the commercially used artificial sweeteners. It was invented in 1937 by graduate student Michael Sveda at the University of Illinois.

1938 Fiberglass

- The technique of heating and drawing glass into fine fibers has been used for millennia. The use of these fibers for textile applications is more recent. The first commercial production of fiberglass was in 1936. In 1938, fiberglass was invented by Russell Games Slayter of Owens-Corning.

1938 Xerography

- Xerography, which means "dry writing" in Greek, is a process of making copies. Xerography makes copies without using ink. In this process, static electricity charges a lighted plate; a plastic powder is applied to the areas of the page to remain white. The photocopier was invented in 1938 by Chester Floyd Carlson who marketed his revolutionary device to about 20 companies before he could interest any. The Haloid Company, later called the Xerox Corporation, marketed it, and xerography eventually became common and inexpensive.

1938 Nylon

- In 1938, a team of researchers working under Wallace H. Carothers at E. I. du Pont de Nemours and Company invented a plastic that can be drawn into strong, silk-like fibers. Nylon soon became popular as a fabric for hosiery as well as industrial applications such as cordage.

1938 Operant conditioning chamber

- Also known as a Skinner box, an operant conditioning chamber is a laboratory apparatus used in the experimental analysis of behavior to study animal behavior. The operant conditioning chamber was invented in 1938 by B. F. Skinner.

1938 Soft serve ice cream

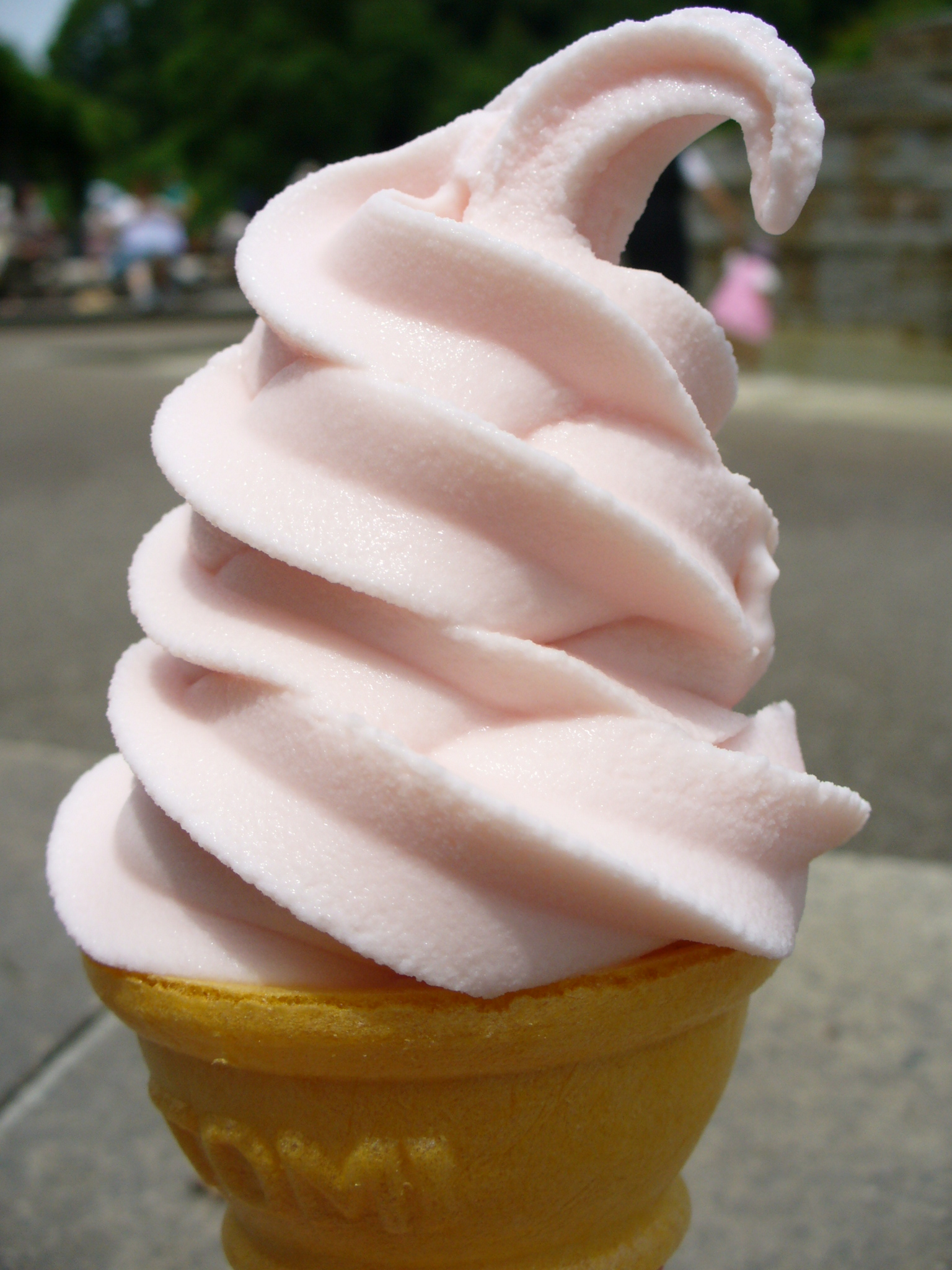
Soft serve ice cream in strawberry flavor

- Not to be confused with regular ice cream of the slow, churned type which was invented in China over two millennia ago, soft serve is a distinctive type of frozen dessert that is similar to, but much softer than, ice cream. In 1938, J.F. "Grandpa" McCullough and his son Alex co-invented soft serve ice cream, devising a new way to serve ice cream in its soft, creamy form that it takes before going into the deep freeze to make it scoopable. After Alex McCullough commissioned Harry Oltz in 1939 to design the first soft serve ice cream machine, similar to ones used for making frozen custard, the Dairy Queen franchise was founded when Sherb Noble opened the first store in 1940.

1938 Teflon

- In chemistry, polytetrafluoroethylene is a synthetic fluoropolymer which finds numerous applications. PTFE is best known by the DuPont brand name Teflon. PTFE was accidentally invented by Roy Plunkett of Kinetic Chemicals in 1938.

1939 Yield sign

- In road transport, a yield sign or give way sign indicates that a vehicle driver must prepare to stop if necessary to let a driver on another approach proceed. However, there is no need to stop if his way is clear. A driver who stops has yielded his right of way to another. The yield sign, but not the yield traffic rule itself, was invented in 1939 by Tulsa police officer Clinton Riggs.

1939 VU meter

- A VU meter is often included in analog circuit, audio equipment to display a signal level in Volume Units. It is intentionally a "slow" measurement, averaging out peaks and troughs of short duration to reflect the perceived loudness of the material. It was originally invented in 1939 by the combined effort of Bell Labs and broadcasters CBS and NBC for measuring and standardizing the levels of telephone lines. The instrument used to measure VU is called the volume indicator (VI) instrument. Most users ignore this and call it a VU meter.

1939 Starting gate

- A starting gate, also known as starting stalls, is a machine used in the sports of thoroughbred horse and dog racing to ensure a fair start in a race. The starting gate was invented by Clay Puett of Chillicothe, Texas, when it was used at Lansdowne Park in Vancouver, British Columbia, Canada for the first time on July 1, 1939. U.S. patent #2,232,675 was filed by Puett on August 7, 1939, and issued to him on February 18, 1941.

1939 Twist tie

- A twist tie is a metal wire that is encased in a thin strip of paper or plastic and is used to tie the openings of bags, such as garbage bags or bread bags. A twist tie is used by wrapping it around the item to be fastened, then twisting the ends together. The original twist tie was invented by the California-based packaging company T and T Industries, Inc. It was patented in 1939 and marketed as the Twist-Ems.

1939 Automated teller machine

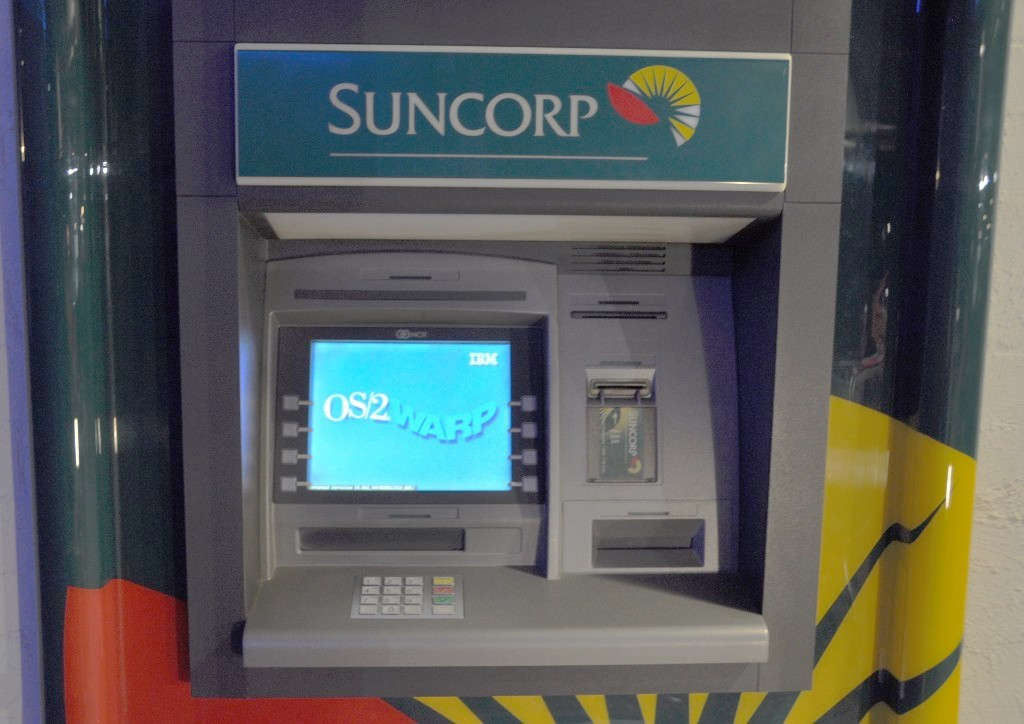
A Suncorp Metway ATM

- An automated teller machine (ATM) is a computerized telecommunications device that provides the clients of a financial institution with access to financial transactions in a public space without the need for a cashier, human clerk or bank teller. ATMs are known by various other names including automatic banking machine, cash machine, and various regional variants derived from trademarks on ATM systems held by particular banks. Financial transactions such as deposits, withdrawals, and transfers of accounts may be conducted at ATM's by inserting an ATM card. In 1939, Armenian-American inventor Luther George Simjian initially came up with the idea of creating a hole-in-the-wall machine that would allow customers to make financial transactions. The idea was met with a great deal of skepticism after Citicorp tested it. In later years and after Simjian filed 20 patents related to the device, the idea and the gradual usage of ATM's became more widespread around the world.

1939 Vocoder

- A vocoder, a portmanteau of the words voice and encoder, is an analysis and synthesis system, mostly used for speech. In the encoder, the input is passed through a multiband filter, each band is passed through an envelope follower, and the control signals from the envelope followers are communicated to the decoder. The decoder applies these control signals to corresponding filters in the (re)synthesizer. Research physicist Homer Dudley invented the Vocoder at Bell Labs in 1939 which had the purpose of improving the voice-carrying capabilities of his employer's telephone lines.

1940 Fluxgate magnetometer

- A fluxgate magnetometer measures the direction and magnitude of magnetic fields. Fluxgate magnetometer sensors are manufactured in several geometries and recently have made significant improvements in noise performance, crossfield tolerance and power utilization. The fluxgate magnetometer was invented by Victor Vacquier in 1940 while working for Gulf Research in Pittsburgh.

1941 Aerosol bomb

- An aerosol bomb is a hand-held container or dispenser from which an aerosol is released. It was developed in 1941 by Lyle D. Goodhue and William N. Sullivan and patented in 1943.

1941 Deodorant

- Deodorants are substances applied to the body to reduce body odor caused by the bacterial breakdown of perspiration. Jules Montenier holds a number of patents. Arguably, his January 28, 1941, patent for Astringent Preparation is his most famous which dealt with solving the problem of the excessive acidity of aluminum chloride, then and now the best working antiperspirant, by adding a soluble nitrile or a similar compound. This innovation found its way into "Stopette" deodorant spray, which Time Magazine called "the best-selling deodorant of the early 1950s".

1941 Acrylic fiber

- Acrylic fibers are synthetic fibers made from a polymer Polyacrylonitrile with an average molecular weight of ~100,000, about 1900 monomer units. To be called acrylic in the United States, the polymer must contain at least 85% acrylonitrile monomer. Typical comonomers are vinyl acetate or methyl acrylate. The Dupont Corporation invented the first acrylic fibers in 1941 and trademarked them under the name "Orlon".

1941 Electric guitar (solid body)

- A solid body electric guitar, made up of hardwood with a lacquer coating, is an electric guitar that has no hollow internal cavity to accommodate vibration. There are no sound holes such as those used to amplify string vibrations in acoustic guitars. The sound that is audible in music featuring electric guitars is produced by pickups on the guitar that convert the string vibrations into an electrical signal, usually fed into an amplifier or a speaker. The solid body guitar was invented in 1941 by American recording artist Les Paul.

1942 Bazooka

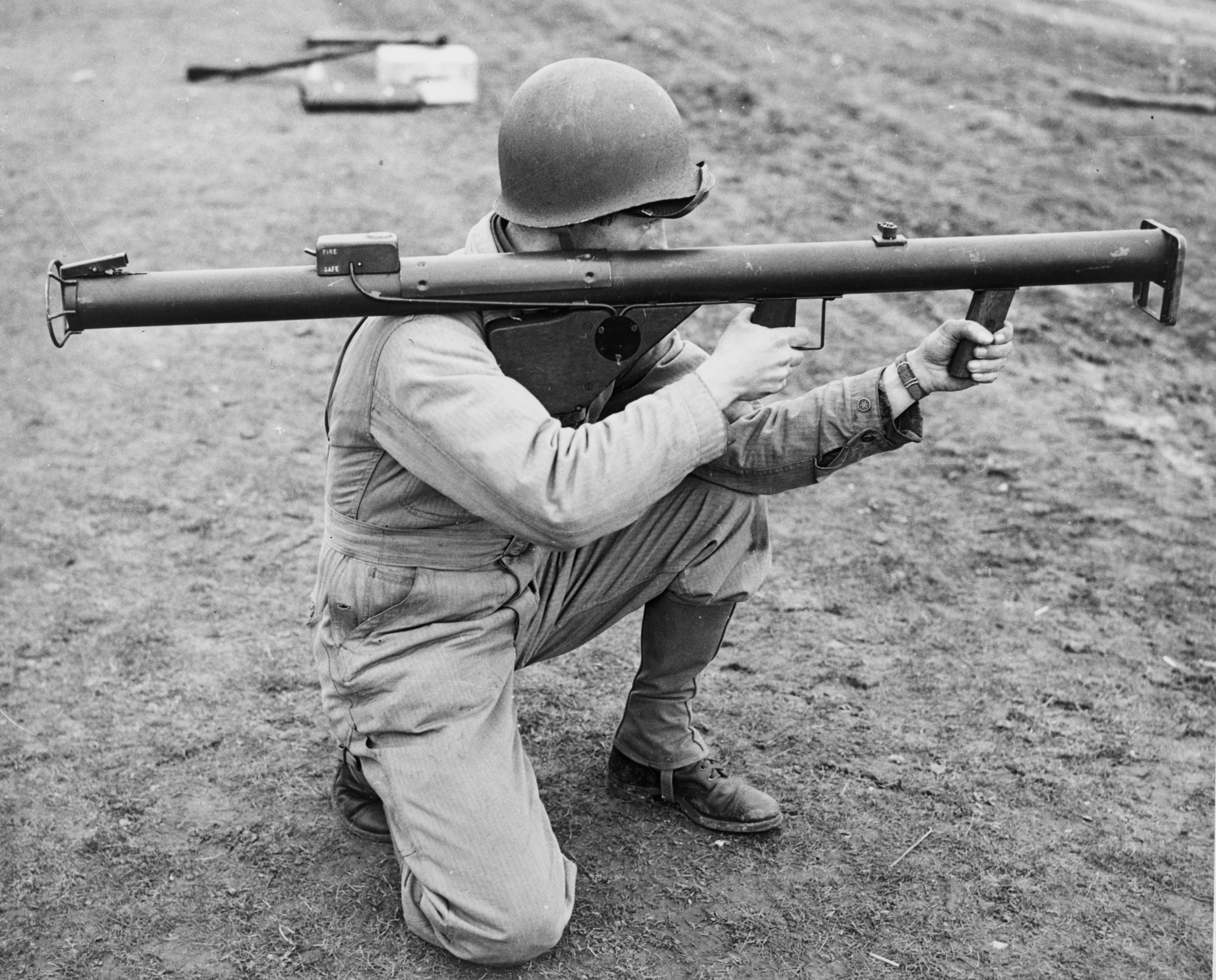
A soldier holding an M1 bazooka

- A bazooka is a shoulder-fired, man-portable recoilless rocket anti-tank warfare weapon that has a solid rocket motor for propulsion, allowing for high explosive (HE) and high-explosive anti-tank (HEAT) warheads to be delivered against armored vehicles, machine gun nests, and fortified bunkers at ranges beyond that of a standard thrown grenade or mine. The bazooka was co-invented in February 1942 by Edward Uhl, then a lieutenant in the United States Army, and Colonel Leslie Skinner.

1943 Magnetic proximity fuze

- A magnetic proximity fuze is a type of proximity fuze that initiates a detonator in a piece of ordnance such as a land mine, naval mine, depth charge, or shell when the fuse's magnetic equilibrium is upset by a magnetic object such as a tank or a submarine. Magnetic "pistols" were in use from 1917. In 1943, Panayottis John Eliomarkakis of Philadelphia filed U.S. patent #2,434,551 which was issued on January 13, 1948.

1943 Modern coal-burning steam locomotive

- This invention was only primarily used with steam locomotives that had booster valves or superchargers to heat the fire even hotter to produce extra power. The coal used was semi-bituminous and bituminous coal only inside the steam locomotives. Sadly, this invention lasted until 1960 when Diesel's fully replaced American railroads.

1943 Slinky

- A Slinky or "Lazy Spring" is a toy consisting of a helical spring that stretches and can bounce up and down. It can perform a number of tricks, including traveling down a flight of steps end-over-end as it stretches and re-forms itself with the aid of gravity and its own momentum. The Slinky was invented in 1943 by American engineer Richard T. James while working in his home laboratory to invent a set of springs that could be used to support sensitive instruments on board ships and stabilize them even in rough seas. When he once accidentally knocked one of his springs off a shelf, James saw that, rather than flopping in a heap onto the floor, the spring "stepped" in a series of arcs from the shelf, to a stack of books, to a tabletop, to the floor, where it re-coiled itself and stood upright. In 1945, the James first exhibited his new toy at the Gimbels, a department store located in Philadelphia. He sold 400 Slinkys in 90 minutes which was the start of a sensation that continues to this day.

1945 Microwave oven

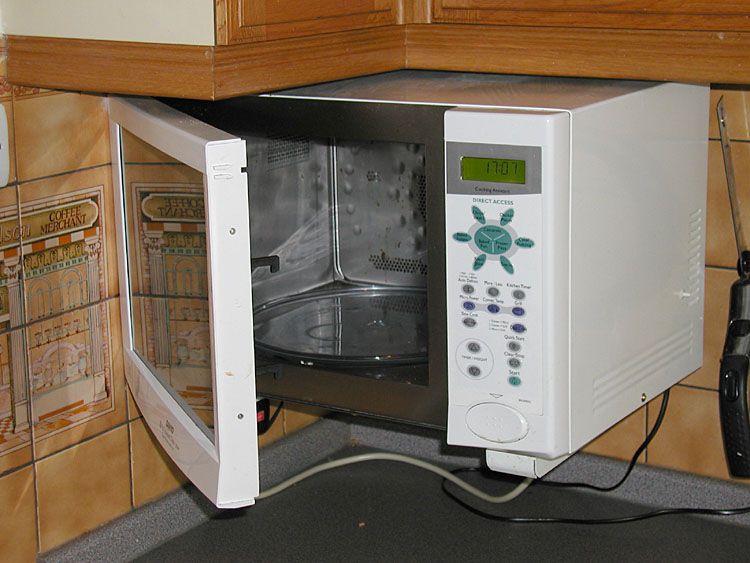
A microwave oven with a turntable

- A microwave oven cooks or heats food by dielectric heating. Cooking food with microwaves was discovered by Percy Spencer on October 8, 1945, while building magnetrons for radar sets at Raytheon. Spencer was working on an active radar set when he noticed a strange sensation, and saw that a peanut candy bar he had in his pocket started to melt. Although he was not the first to notice this phenomenon, as the holder of 120 patents, Spencer was no stranger to discovery and experiment, and realized what was happening. The radar had melted his candy bar with microwaves. The first food to be deliberately cooked with microwaves was popcorn, and the second was an egg. In 1947, Raytheon under Percy Spencer demonstrated the world's first microwave oven built at the company which was called the "Radarange".

1945 Cruise control

- Cruise control automatically controls the rate of motion of a motor vehicle. The driver sets the speed and the system will take over the throttle of the car to maintain the same speed. Cruise control was invented in 1945 by a blind inventor and mechanical engineer named Ralph Teetor. His idea was born out of the frustration of riding in a car driven by his lawyer, who kept speeding up and slowing down as he talked. The first car with Teetor's system was the Chrysler Imperial in 1958. This system calculated ground speed based on driveshaft rotations and used a solenoid to vary throttle position as needed.

1945 Block heater

- A block heater warms the engine of an automobile in order to ease and speed starting and vehicle warm-up in cold weather. The most common type is an electric heating element connected through a power cord often routed through the vehicle's grille. The block heater may replace one of the engine's core plugs, or may be installed in line with one of the radiator or heater hoses. The block heater, first known as a head bolt heater, was invented in 1945 by Andrew Freeman in Grand Forks, North Dakota. Freeman used some scrap hoses and copper tubing onto the heating element of an old flat-iron and produced the first headbolt heater, which warmed the engine's water jacket and the oil film between cylinder heads and pistons. U.S. patent #2,487,326 was filed on November 4, 1946, and issued to Freeman on November 8, 1949.

== See also ==
Timelines of United States inventions

- Timeline of United States inventions (before 1890)
- Timeline of United States inventions (after 1991)

Related topics

- History of United States patent law
- Lemelson Foundation
- Lemelson–MIT Prize
- List of inventors
- List of inventors killed by their own inventions
- List of military inventions
- List of prolific inventors
- NASA spinoff technologies
- National Inventors Hall of Fame
- Science and technology in the United States
- Technological and industrial history of the United States
- Timeline of United States discoveries
- United States Patent and Trademark Office
- United States patent law
- Yankee ingenuity
