= Timeline of United States inventions (after 1991) =

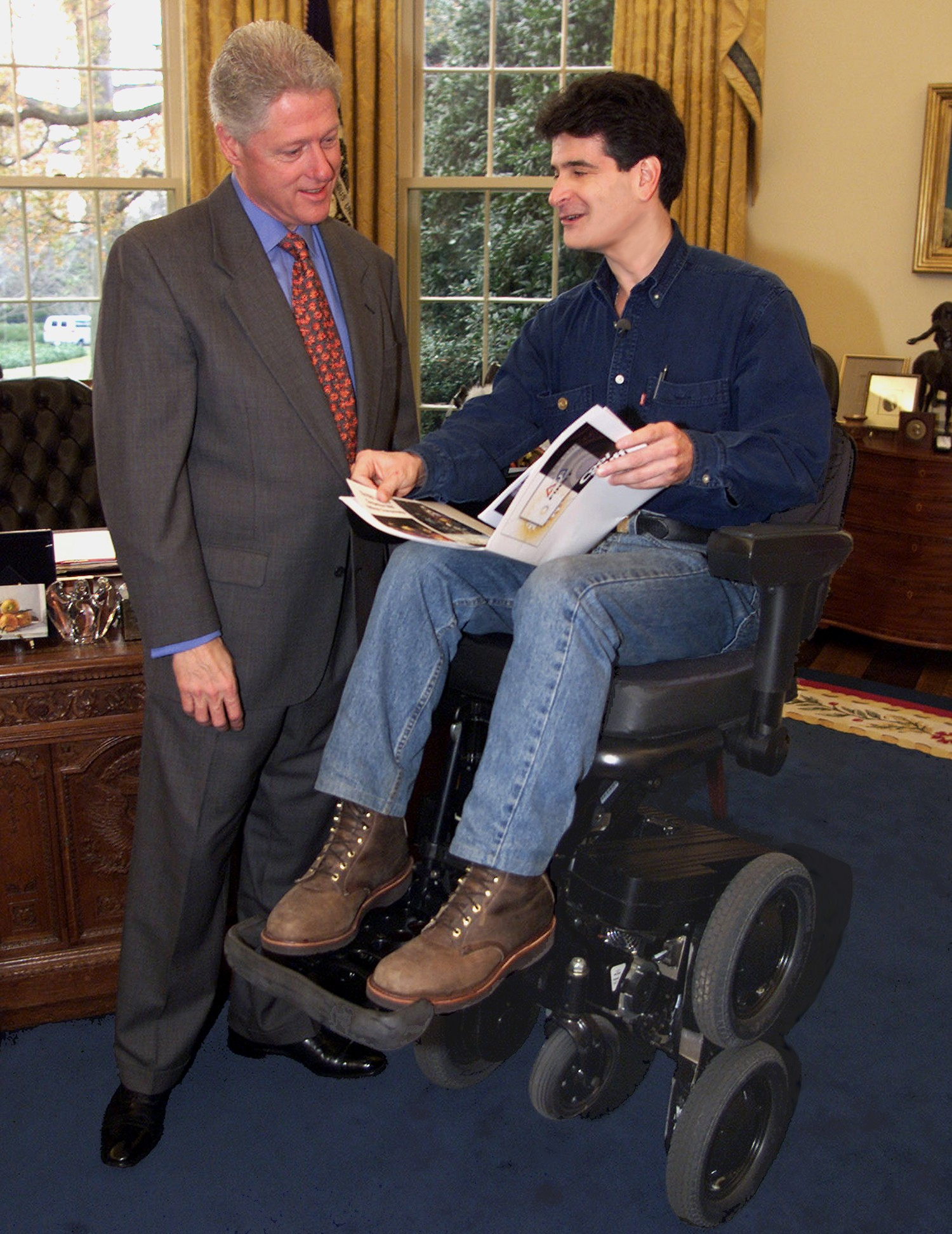
Dean Kamen (b. 1951) demonstrating his iBOT invention to President Bill Clinton in the Oval Office.

A timeline of United States inventions (after 1991) encompasses the ingenuity and innovative advancements of the United States within a historical context, dating from the Contemporary era to the present day, which have been achieved by inventors who are either native-born or naturalized citizens of the United States. Patent protection secures a person's right to their first-to-invent claim of the original invention in question, highlighted in Article I, Section 8, Clause 8 of the United States Constitution which gives the following enumerated power to the United States Congress:

To promote the Progress of Science and useful Arts, by securing for limited Times to Authors and Inventors the exclusive Right to their respective Writings and Discoveries.

In 1641, the first patent in North America was issued to Samuel Winslow by the General Court of Massachusetts for a new method of making salt. On April 10, 1790, President George Washington signed the Patent Act of 1790 (1 Stat. 109) into law which proclaimed that patents were to be authorized for "any useful art, manufacture, engine, machine, or device, or any improvement therein not before known or used." On July 31, 1790, Samuel Hopkins of Pittsford, Vermont became the first person in the United States to file and to be granted a patent for an improved method of "Making Pot and Pearl Ashes." The Patent Act of 1836 (Ch. 357, 5 Stat. 117) further clarified United States patent law to the extent of establishing a patent office where patent applications are filed, processed, and granted, contingent upon the language and scope of the claimant's invention, for a patent term of 14 years with an extension of up to an additional 7 years. However, the Uruguay Round Agreements Act of 1994 (URAA) changed the patent term in the United States to a total of 20 years, effective for patent applications filed on or after June 8, 1995, thus bringing United States patent law further into conformity with international patent law. The modern-day provisions of the law applied to inventions are laid out in Title 35 of the United States Code (Ch. 950, sec. 1, 66 Stat. 792).

From 1836 to 2011, the United States Patent and Trademark Office (USPTO) has granted a total of 7,861,317 patents relating to several well-known inventions appearing throughout the timeline below.

== Post–Cold War and the mid-to-late 1990s (1992–1999) ==
1992 Spinner (wheel)

- A spinner is a type of hubcap that spins independently inside of a wheel itself when a vehicle is in motion, and continues to spin once the vehicle has come to a stop. As an attachment to the car's wheel, a spinner operates by using one or more roller bearings to isolate the spinner from the wheel, allowing it to turn while the wheel is at rest. The invention of the spinner is credited to James J.D. Gragg of Tulsa, Oklahoma who filed a patent on October 28, 1992 and was issued United States Patent #5,290,094 on March 4, 1994.

1994 CMOS image sensor

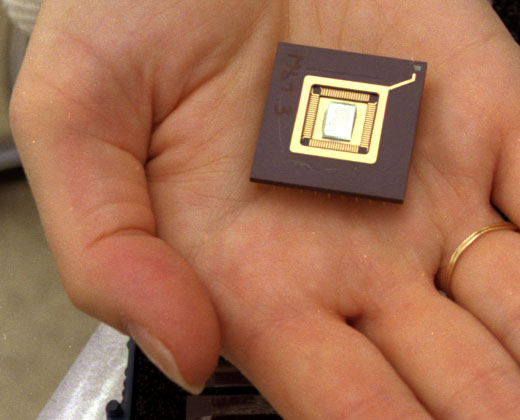
Early prototype of a CMOS image sensor

- A CMOS image sensor (complementary metal-oxide semiconductor) is an image sensor consisting of an integrated circuit containing an array of pixel sensors, each pixel containing a photodetector and an active amplifier. Starting at the same point, they have to convert light into electrons by using the CMOS process. CMOS image sensors can be found in digital SLR cameras, embedded web-cams, video cameras, automotive safety systems, swallowable-pill cameras, toys and video games, and wireless video-security networks. Sunetra Mendis, Eric Fossum, and Sabrina E Kemeny invented the CMOS image sensor while working at NASA's Jet Propulsion Laboratory in Pasadena, California. On January 28, 1994, JPL-NASA filed U.S. patent #5,471,515, which was issued on November 28, 1995.

1994 DNA computing

- DNA computing uses DNA, biochemistry and molecular biology, instead of the traditional silicon-based computer technologies. DNA computing, or, more generally, molecular computing, is a fast-developing interdisciplinary area. Research and development in this area concerns theory, experiments and applications of DNA computing. DNA computing is fundamentally similar to parallel computing in that it takes advantage of the many different molecules of DNA to try many different possibilities at once. Leonard Adleman of the University of Southern California initially pioneered this field in 1994. Adleman demonstrated a proof-of-concept use of DNA as a form of computation which solved the seven-point Hamiltonian path problem.

1994 Segway PT

- The Segway PT is a two-wheeled, self-balancing, zero-emission, electric vehicle used for "personal transport". Segways have had success in niche markets such as transportation for police departments, military bases, warehouses, corporate campuses or industrial sites, as well as in tourism. The earliest patent resembling the modern Segway PT, U.S. patent #6,357,544, was filed on May 27, 1994 and issued to Dean Kamen on December 30, 1997. Kamen introduced his invention to the public in 2001.

1994 Quantum-cascade laser

A quantum cascade laser is a sliver of semiconductor material about the size of a tick. Inside, electrons are constrained within layers of gallium and aluminum compounds, called quantum wells are nanometers thick, much smaller than the thickness of a hair. Electrons jump from one energy level to another, rather than moving smoothly between levels and tunnel from one layer to the next going "through" rather than "over" energy barriers separating the wells. When the electrons jump, they emit photons of light. The quantum cascade laser was co-invented by Alfred Y. Cho, Claire F. Gmachl, Federico Capasso, Deborah Sivco, Albert Hutchinson, and Alessandro Tredicucci at Bell Laboratories in 1994. On April 4, 1994, the Bell Labs team filed U.S. patent #5,457,709 that was issued on October 10, 1995.

1995 Bose–Einstein condensate

- A Bose–Einstein condensate (BEC) is a state of matter of bosons confined in an external potential and cooled to temperatures very near to absolute zero (0 K or −273.15 °C or −459.67 °F). Satyendra Nath Bose and Albert Einstein first conceptualized BEC in 1924–1925; in 1995 Wolfgang Ketterle at MIT and Eric Cornell and Carl Wieman at the University of Colorado at Boulder National Institute of Standards and Technology Laboratory produced a BEC.

1995 Screenless hammer mill

- The screenless hammer mill, like regular hammer mills, is used to pound grain. The screenless hammer mill uses air flow to separate small particles from larger ones, rather than a screen, and is thus more reliable which results in much more energy efficiency. The screenless hammer mill was invented in 1995 by MIT professor and engineer Amy B. Smith.

1995 Scroll wheel

- A scroll wheel (or mouse wheel), a hard plastic or rubbery disc on a computer mouse, is used to scroll a pointer up or down on a computer display. It is perpendicular to the mouse surface and is normally located between the left and right mouse buttons. Eric Michelman invented the scroll wheel at Microsoft by in 1995. On December 16, 1998, Michelman filed the earliest patent for a scroll wheel, U.S. patent #6,940,488, which was later issued to him on September 6, 2005.

1995 JavaScript

- JavaScript, a scripting language widely used for client-side web development, became the originating dialect of the ECMAScript standard. It is a dynamic, weakly typed, prototype-based language with first-class functions. JavaScript was influenced by many languages and was designed to look like Java, but to be easier for non-programmers to work with. Brendan Eich invented JavaScript (which he called Mocha) in 1995; it later became renamed to LiveScript, and finally to JavaScript.

1996 Adobe Flash

- Adobe Flash is a multimedia platform created by Macromedia and currently developed and distributed by Adobe Systems. Since its introduction in 1996, Flash has become a popular method for adding animation and interactivity to web pages. Jonathan Gay wrote the Flash code in 1996 by while in college and extended it while working for Silicon Beach Software and its successors.

1996 Bait car

- A bait car is a vehicle used by a law enforcement agency to capture car thieves. The vehicles are specially modified with features including GPS tracking and hidden cameras that record audio, video, time and date, which can all be remotely monitored by police. A remote-controlled immobilizer is installed in the vehicle that allows police to disable the engine and lock the doors. Jason Cecchettini invented the concept and technology in 1996.

1997 Virtual reality therapy

- Virtual reality immersion therapy or VRIT is a method using specially encoded virtual environments and computers to evaluate and treat anxiety disorders such as acrophobia or PTSD. Conceived in the early 1990s by Dr. Ralph Lamson, VRIT was clinically proven and the key patent 6,425,764 was filed in 1997 for this major contribution to treatment of medical conditions involving sensory induced disorders by recreating such sensations in a controlled manner in an immersive virtual environment with feedback to achieve mastery over the causative sensations.

1998 HVLS fan

- An HVLS fan ("HVLS" stands for "high-volume low-speed") is a type of rotational mechanical fan that moves large amounts of circulating air. Using 10 overhead airfoil blades in a barn, the HVLS fan was invented in 1998 by Walter Boyd who was challenged to find a better means to reduce the heat stress of dairy cattle which in turn, would increase milk production.

1999 Torino scale

- The Torino scale, invented by Richard P. Binzel in 1999, is a method for categorizing the impact hazard associated with near-Earth objects (NEOs) such as asteroids and comets. It was intended as a tool for astronomers and the public to assess the seriousness of collision predictions, by combining probability statistics and known kinetic damage potentials into a single threat-value.

1999 Phase-change incubator

- The phase-change incubator is a low-cost, low-maintenance incubator to help test for microorganisms in water supplies. It uses small balls containing a chemical compound that, when heated and then kept insulated, will stay at 37 °C (approx. 99 °F) for 24 hours. MIT professor and engineer Amy B. Smith invented the phase-change incubator in 1999.

1999 iBOT

- The iBOT is a stable and mobile powered wheelchair that balances on two of a total of six wheels. The iBOT is capable of climbing stairs as well as giving the user the ability to make eye-contact with a standing individual. Dean Kamen invented the iBOT in 1999. Kamen filed U.S. patent #6311794 on October 27, 1999 and later being issued on November 6, 2001.

1999 Camera phone

- The introduction of the camera phone in 1999 was an innovation that changed the daily lives of millions of people around the world. It allowed people to instantly take photos and videos, and eventually became the largest part of the digital camera industry.

== 2000s decade ==
2001 iPod

- The iPod is a line of portable media players and multi-purpose pocket computers[2] designed and marketed by Apple Inc. The first version was released on October 23, 2001, about 8 1/2 months after the Macintosh version of iTunes was released. As of May 28, 2019, only the iPod Touch (7th generation) remains in production.

2002 SERF

- A spin-exchange relaxation-free (SERF) magnetometer achieves very high magnetic field sensitivity by monitoring a high density vapor of alkali metal atoms precessing in a near-zero magnetic field. SERF magnetometers are among the most sensitive magnetic field sensors and in some cases exceed the performance of SQUID detectors of equivalent size. The SERF magnetometer was invented by Michael V. Romalis at Princeton University in 2002.

2003 Fermionic condensate

- A fermionic condensate is a superfluid phase formed by fermionic particles at low temperatures. The first atomic fermionic condensate was invented by Deborah S. Jin in 2003.

2005 YouTube

- Born from the PayPal Mafia in 2005, YouTube is the world's most popular video sharing site. In 2006, Google bought YouTube for $1.65 billion.

2006 Blu-ray Disc

- A digital optical disc data storage format. It was designed to supersede the DVD format, and is capable of storing several hours of video in high-definition.

2007 Nanowire battery

- A nanowire battery is a lithium-ion battery consisting of a stainless steel anode covered in silicon nanowires. Silicon, which stores ten times more lithium than graphite, allows a far greater energy density on a steel anode, thus reducing the mass of the battery. The high surface area further allows for fast charging and discharging. The practicality of nanowire batteries is reasoned that a laptop computer that runs on a regular lithium-ion battery for two hours could potentially operate up to 20 hours using a nanowire battery without recharging, which would be a considerable advantage for many people resulting in energy conservation and cost savings. The nanowire battery was co-invented in 2007 by Chinese-American Dr. Yi Cui, an assistant professor of materials science and engineering along with his colleagues at Stanford University.

2007 iPhone

- The iPhone is a line of smartphones designed and marketed by Apple Inc. All generations of the iPhone use Apple's iOS mobile operating system software. The first-generation iPhone was released on June 29, 2007, and multiple new hardware iterations with new iOS releases have been released since.

2007 Amazon Kindle

- In 2007, Amazon released the original Amazon Kindle e-book reader. While not the first of its kind, the Kindle led the charge to popularizing e-books and e-readers.

2008 Bionic contact lens

- A bionic contact lens is a digital contact lens worn directly on the human eye which in the future, scientists believe could one day serve as a useful virtual platform for activities such as surfing the World Wide Web, superimposing images on real-world objects, playing video games for entertainment, and for monitoring patients' medical conditions. The bionic contact lens is a form of nanotechnology and microfabrication constructed of light emitting diodes, an antenna, and electronic circuit wiring. The bionic contact lens is the 2008 creation of Iranian-American Babak Parviz, an electrical engineer at the University of Washington (UW) in Seattle.

== 2010s decade ==
2010 iPad

The January 27, 2010, launch of the iPad by Apple, Inc. marked the first large-scale commercial release of a tablet computer.

2012 3D bioprinting

Three dimensional (3D) bioprinting is the utilization of 3D printing–like techniques to combine cells, growth factors, and/or biomaterials to fabricate biomedical parts, often with the aim of imitating natural tissue characteristics. In 2012, otolaryngologist Glenn Green led a team that bioengineered one of the first synthetic tracheas to stabilize the breathing of a struggling baby.

2013 Smart doorbell

Jamie Siminoff introduced the Ring video doorbell in 2013, providing an internet-connected doorbell that notifies the homeowner on their device when a visitor arrives at the door. These devices also combined motion-sensing video monitoring with door alert capabilities for the first time. The global smart doorbell market was valued at $2.667 billion in 2021 and is projected to reach $14.441 billion by 2031.

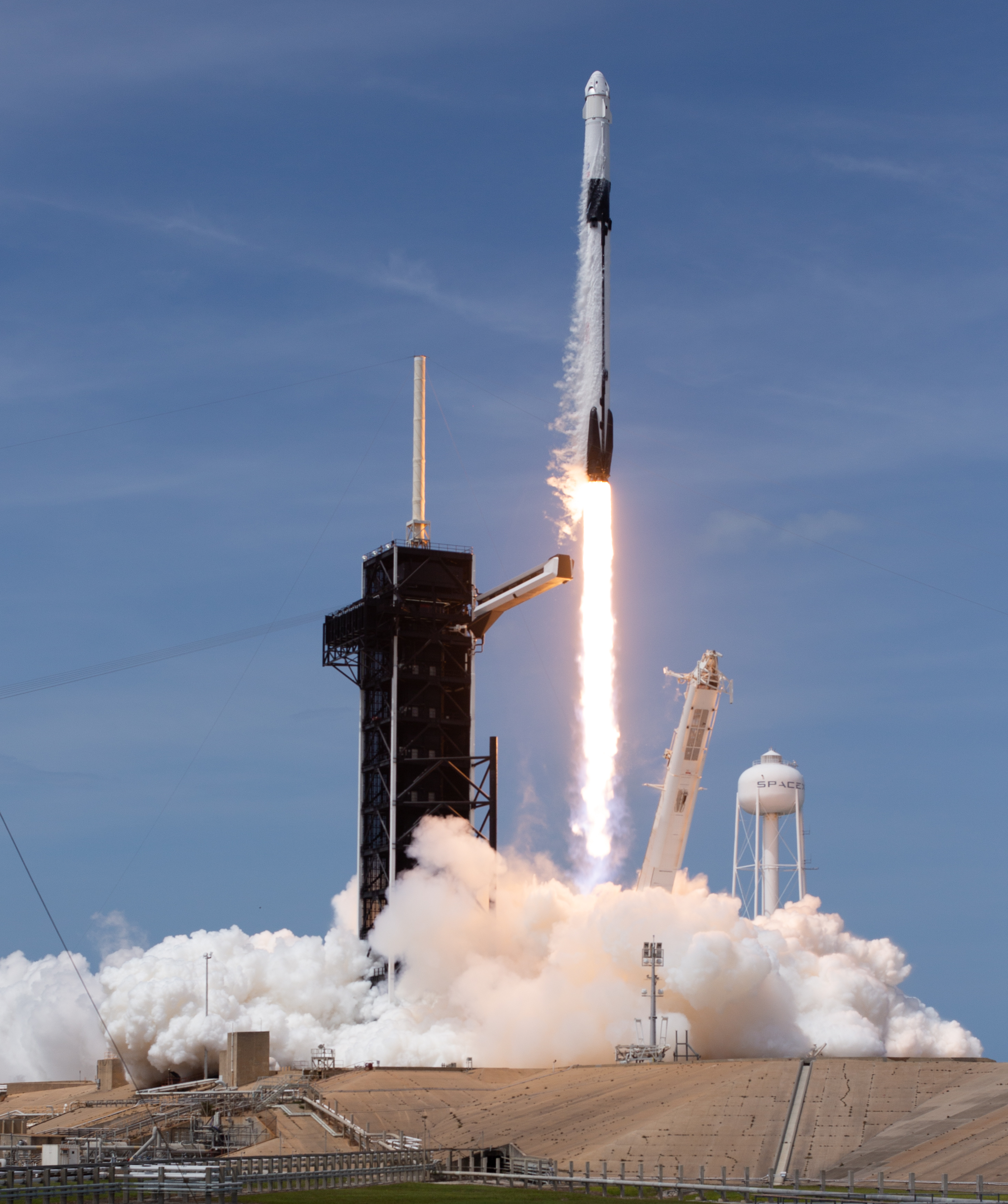
A reusable Falcon 9 rocket lifts off.

2015 Reusable launch vehicle

- The first rocket capable of exiting Earth's atmosphere, returning, and landing safely did so on November 23, 2015, in Corn Ranch, Texas. Blue Origin's New Shepard rocket was the first to accomplish the feat, followed soon after by SpaceX's Falcon 9 rocket. SpaceX now routinely recovers and reuses their first stages, as well as reusing fairings.

== 2020s decade ==
2020 COVID-19 vaccines

- The FDA gave the first emergency use authorization for the Pfizer–BioNTech COVID-19 vaccine on 11 December, 2020.

2022 ChatGPT

On 30 November 2022 OpenAI releases ChatGPT a powerful artificial intelligence chatbot that helps accelerate the AI boom.

== See also ==
Timelines of United States inventions

- Timeline of United States inventions (before 1890)
- Timeline of United States inventions (1890–1945)

Related topics

- History of United States patent law
- Lemelson Foundation
- Lemelson–MIT Prize
- List of African American inventors and scientists
- List of Puerto Ricans
- List of inventors
- List of inventors killed by their own inventions
- List of Puerto Ricans in the United States Space Program
- Military invention
- NASA spinoff
- National Inventors Hall of Fame
- Native American contributions
- Science and technology in the United States
- Technological and industrial history of the United States
- Timeline of United States discoveries
- United States Patent and Trademark Office
- United States patent law
- Yankee ingenuity
