= List of appropriate technology applications =

Appropriate technologies find many applications in building and construction, agriculture, water and sanitation, energy generation and uses, transportation, health care, food preparation and storage, information and communication technologies, as well as finance.

== Building and construction ==
In order to increase the efficiency of city services (water provisioning, electricity provisioning, easy traffic flow, water drainage, decreased spread of disease with epidemics, etc.), the city itself must first be built correctly. In the developing world, many cities are expanding rapidly and new ones are being built. Urban planning is therefore important.

- Adobe (including the variation called Super Adobe),
- Rammed earth,
- Compressed earth block,
- Animal products,
- Cob
- and/or other green building materials could be considered appropriate earth building technology for much of the developing world, as they make use of materials which are widely available locally and are thus relatively inexpensive.

The local context must be considered as, for example, mudbrick may not be durable in a high rainfall area (although a large roof overhang and cement stabilisation can be used to correct for this), and, if the materials are not readily available, the method may be inappropriate. Other forms of natural building may be considered appropriate technology, though in many cases the emphasis is on sustainability and self-sufficiency rather than affordability or suitability. As such, many buildings are also built to function as autonomous buildings (e.g., earthships). One example of an organisation that applies appropriate earthbuilding techniques would be Builders Without Borders.

The building structure must also be considered. Cost-effectiveness is an important issue in projects based around appropriate technology, and one of the most efficient designs herein is the public housing approach. This approach lets everyone have their own condominium, yet incorporate communal spaces such as mess halls, latrines, and public showers.

In addition, to decrease costs of operation (heating, cooling, etc.) techniques as Earth sheltering and Trombe walls are often incorporated.

Organizations as Architecture for Humanity also follows principles consistent with appropriate technology, aiming to serve the needs of poor and disaster-affected people.

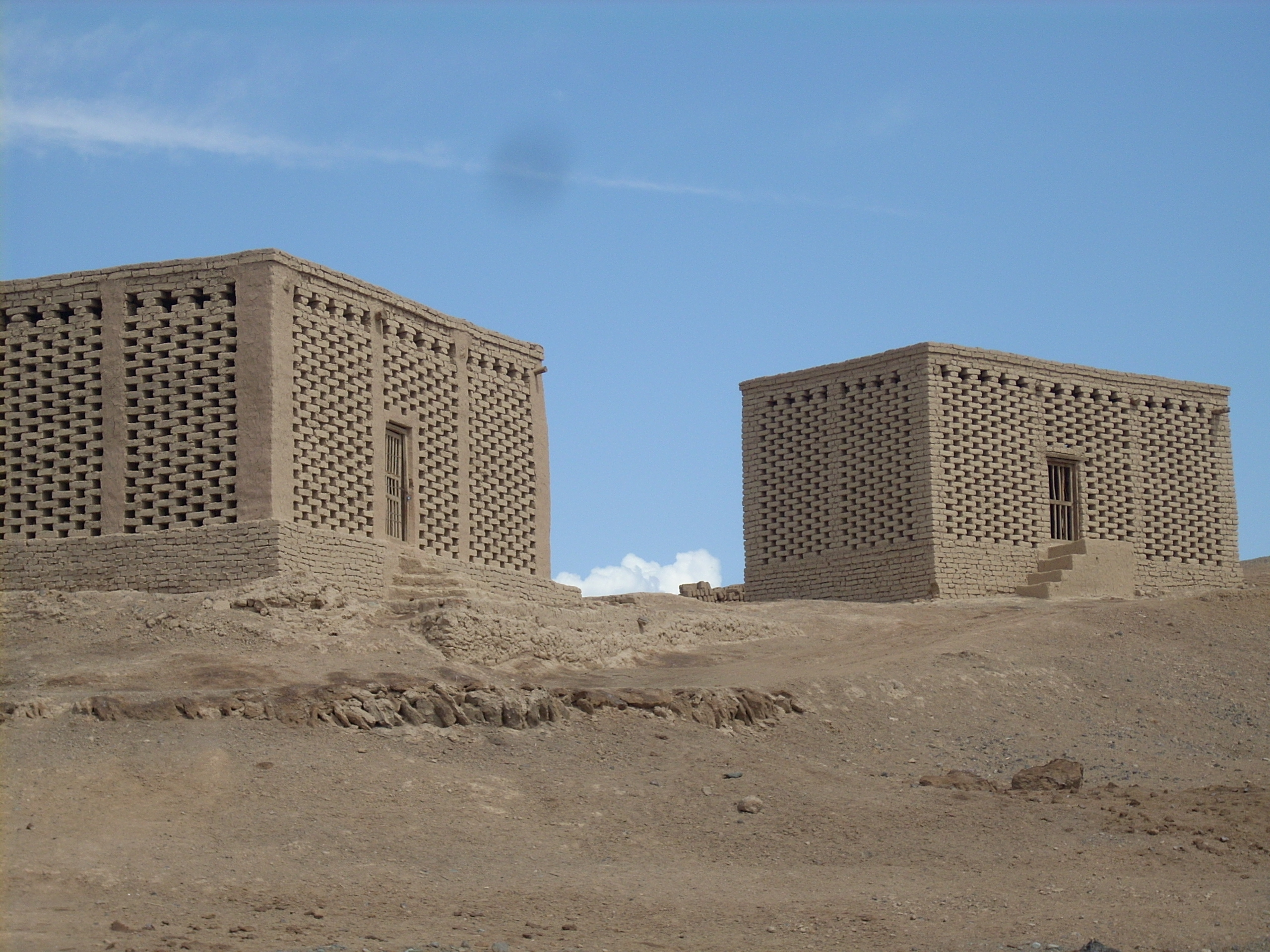
Chunche, naturally ventilated sheds for drying raisins in Xinjiang

- Natural ventilation can be created by providing vents in the upper level of a building to allow warm air to rise by convection and escape to the outside, while cooler air is drawn in through vents at the lower level.
- Electrical powered fans (e.g., ceiling fans) allow efficient cooling, at a far lower electricity consumption as airconditioning systems.
- A solar chimney often referred to as thermal chimney improves this natural ventilation by using convection of air heated by passive solar energy. To further maximize the cooling effect, the incoming air may be led through underground ducts before it is allowed to enter the building.
- A windcatcher (Badgir; بادگیر) is a traditional Persian architectural device used for many centuries to create natural ventilation in buildings. It is not known who first invented the windcatcher, but it still can be seen in many countries today. Windcatchers come in various designs, such as the uni-directional, bi-directional, and multi-directional.
- A passive down-draft cooltower may be used in a hot, arid climate to provide a sustainable way to provide air conditioning. Water is allowed to evaporate at the top of a tower, either by using evaporative cooling pads or by spraying water. Evaporation cools the incoming air, causing a downdraft of cool air that will bring down the temperature inside the building.

== Agriculture ==
Appropriate technology has been applied extensively to improve agricultural production in developing countries. In the United States, the National Center for Appropriate Technology operates ATTRA (attra.ncat.org), a national sustainable agriculture assistance program.

The focus of discussion and research regarding technology adoption is the small scale farm, because it accounts for the majority of the planet's agricultural output. The ethical question that emerges in the research is how much to focus on increasing the productivity of a nation's agricultural output and how much to address food insecurity in the population, including among farmers themselves. This issue of framing is significant because if countries are producing enough food for their populations, yet people are still not getting adequate amounts of food or proper nutrition, it is a problem of availability and distribution rather than production. It is possible for countries to have the agricultural capabilities to be completely self-supportive, but still have many food-insecure citizens. India is an example of this situation. The opposite can also be true; as of 2012, neither Hong Kong nor Singapore had the internal capability to sustainably feed their respective populations, yet they had much better rates of food-security than India. A problem can arise when research focuses solely on advancements in production, ignoring the problem of food-insecurity in these communities.

Food insecurity is more than just a matter of increasing farm production: it is also about farm household income, location, amount of debt, and level of education. Rural and impoverished communities are disproportionately and adversely affected by inequitable distribution of food and resources. Increasing food production and output will not make distributing food easier or more equitable. Confronting these more difficult issues is the future of the sector's discussions and actions.

== Water and sanitation ==
=== Water ===
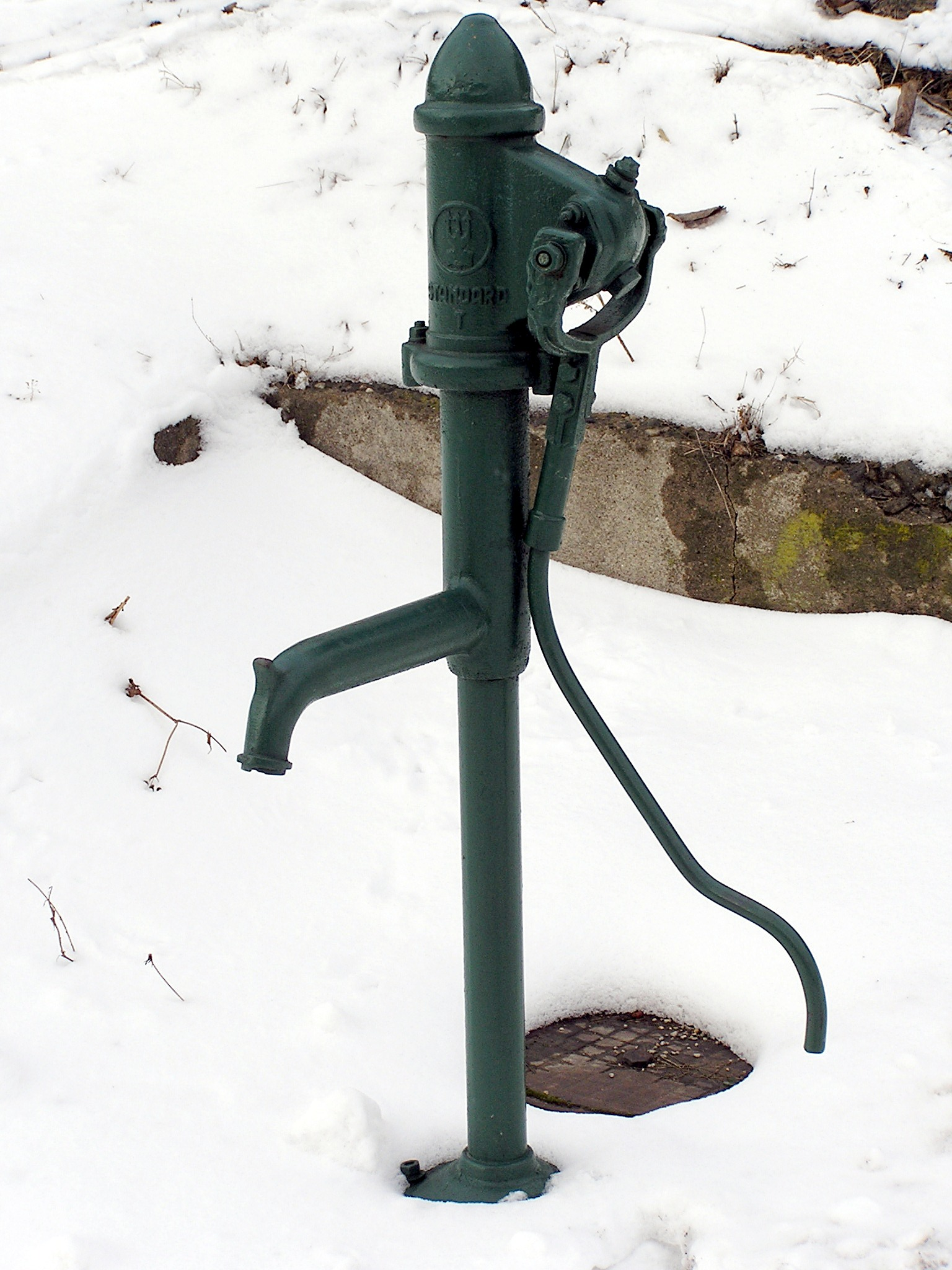
Hand-operated, reciprocating, positive displacement, water pump in Košice-Tahanovce, Slovakia (walking beam pump).

As of 2006, waterborne diseases are estimated to cause 1.8 million deaths each year while about 1.1 billion people lack proper drinking water.

Water generally needs treatment before use, depending on the source and the intended use (with high standards required for drinking water). The quality of water from household connections and community water points in low-income countries is not reliably safe for direct human consumption. Water extracted directly from surface waters and open hand-dug shallow wells nearly always requires treatment.

Appropriate technology options in water treatment include both community-scale and household-scale point-of-use (POU) designs.

The most reliable way to kill microbial pathogenic agents is to heat water to a rolling boil. Other techniques, such as varying forms of filtration, chemical disinfection, and exposure to ultraviolet radiation (including solar UV) have been demonstrated in an array of randomized control trials to significantly reduce levels of waterborne disease among users in low-income countries.

Over the past decade, an increasing number of field-based studies have been undertaken to determine the success of POU measures in reducing waterborne disease. The ability of POU options to reduce disease is a function of both their ability to remove microbial pathogens if properly applied and such social factors as ease of use and cultural appropriateness. Technologies may generate more (or less) health benefit than their lab-based microbial removal performance would suggest.

The current priority of the proponents of POU treatment is to reach large numbers of low-income households on a sustainable basis. Few POU measures have reached significant scale thus far, but efforts to promote and commercially distribute these products to the world's poor have only been under way for a few years.

On the other hand, small-scale water treatment is reaching increasing fractions of the population in low-income countries, particularly in South and Southeast Asia, in the form of water treatment kiosks (also known as water refill stations or packaged water producers). While quality control and quality assurance in such locations may be variable, sophisticated technology (such as multi-stage particle filtration, UV irradiation, ozonation, and membrane filtration) is applied with increasing frequency. Such microenterprises are able to vend water at extremely low prices, with increasing government regulation. Initial assessments of vended water quality are encouraging.

Whether applied at the household or community level, some examples of specific treatment processes include:

- Porous ceramic filtration, using either clay or diatomaceous earth, and oriented as either cylinder, pot, or disk, with gravity-fed or siphon-driven delivery systems. Silver is frequently added to provide antimicrobial enhancement
- Intermittently operated slow-sand filtration, also known as biosand filtration
- Chlorine disinfection, employing calcium hypochlorite powder, sodium hypochlorite solution, or sodium dichloroisocyanurate (NaDCC) tablets
- Chemical flocculation, using either commercially produced iron or aluminum salts or the crushed seeds of certain plants, such as Moringa oleifera. Recent work has shown even table salt (NaCl) is effective at removing high-activity clays for solar water disinfection.
- Irradiation with ultraviolet light, whether using electric-powered lamps or direct solar exposure such as with the SODIS method
- Mixed flocculation/disinfection using commercially produced powdered mixtures
- membrane filtration, employing ultrafiltration or reverse osmosis filter elements preceded by pretreatment

Some appropriate technology water supply measures include:

- Deep wells with submersible pumps in areas where the groundwater (aquifers) are located at depths >10 m.
- Shallow wells with lined walls and covers.
- Rainwater harvesting systems with an appropriate method of storage, especially in areas with significant dry seasons.
- Fog collection, which is suitable for areas which experience fog even when there is little rain.
- Air wells, a structure or device designed to promote the condensation of atmospheric moisture.
- Handpumps and treadle pumps are generally only an option in areas is located at a relatively shallow depth (e.g., 10 m). The Flexi-Pipe Pump is a notable exception to this (up to 25 meters). For deeper aquifers (<10 m), The Rope pump and submersible pumps placed inside a well can be used. Treadle pumps for household irrigation are now being distributed on a widespread basis in developing countries. The principle of Village Level Operation and Maintenance is important with handpumps, but may be difficult in application.
- Condensation bags and condensation pits can be an appropriate technology to get water, yet yields are low and are (for the amount of water obtained), labour-intensive. Still, it may be a cheap solution for certain desperate communities.
- The hippo water roller and Q-drum allow more water to be carried, with less effort and could thus be a good alternative for ethnic communities who do not wish to give up water gathering from remote locations, assuming low topographic relief.
- The roundabout playpump, developed and used in southern Africa, harnesses the energy of children at play to pump water.

=== Sanitation ===
Poor sanitation is a major issue for a large proportion of the human population, with about 2.5 billion people lacking even the most basic forms of sanitation and more than a billion people worldwide practising open defecation in 2015 according to the Joint Monitoring Programme for Water Supply and Sanitation of the United Nations.

The ideas of appropriate technology influenced the provision of sanitation systems for many years. However, since about the early 2000s there has been a departure from a focus on simplistic 'one-size-fits-all' sanitation systems. As conditions vary, sanitation systems also need to vary to meet the needs of the users and other stakeholders.

Technologies for sanitation provision, such as toilets, are important but only one piece of the puzzle. Sanitation needs to be regarded as a system that includes technical and non-technical aspects, such as behavior change and management as well as political aspects – the enabling environment. The overall aim should be to achieve a sustainable sanitation system. One option of achieving that aim can be the ecological sanitation approach which focuses on safe reuse of excreta.

It is impossible to name all possible sanitation technologies that may fall under the category of "appropriate technologies" but some common systems which might be considered to be "appropriate" include:

- Dry toilets as they save on flushing water and may allow the nutrients of the excreta to be reused in agriculture (e.g., for fertilising crops). Two examples of dry toilets are composting toilets and urine-diverting dry toilets.
- Constructed wetlands which can treat wastewater and greywater and require only little electrical power.
- The SanPlat is a simple plate that can be used to cover the hole in the ground of pit latrines making them potentially more easy to clean and maintain.
- The Arborloo which is a very simple low-cost type of composting toilet suitable for rural areas.

== Energy generation and uses ==
The term soft energy technology was coined by Amory Lovins to describe "appropriate" renewable energy. "Appropriate" energy technologies are especially suitable for isolated and/or small scale energy needs. Electricity can be provided from:

- Photovoltaic (PV) solar panels, and (large) Concentrating solar power plants. PV solar panels made from low-cost photovoltaic cells or PV-cells which have first been concentrated by a Luminescent solar concentrator-panel are also a good option. Especially companies as Solfocus make appropriate technology CSP plants which can be made from waste plastics polluting the surroundings (see above).
- Solar thermal collector
- wind power (home do-it yourself turbines and larger-scale)
- micro hydro, and pico hydro
- human-powered handwheel generators
- other zero emission generation methods

Some intermediate technologies include:

- Bioalcohols as bioethanol, biomethanol and biobutanol. The first two require minor modifications to allow them to be used in conventional gasoline engines. The third requires no modifications at all.
- Vegetable oils which can be used only in internal combustion (Diesel) engines. Biofuels are locally available in many developing countries and can be cheaper than fossil fuels.
- Anaerobic digestion power plants
- Biogas is another potential source of energy, particularly where there is an abundant supply of waste organic matter. A generator (running on biofuels) can be run more efficiently if combined with batteries and an inverter; this adds significantly to capital cost but reduces running cost, and can potentially make this a much cheaper option than the solar, wind and micro-hydro options.
- Dry animal dung fuel can also be used.
- Biochar is another similar energy source which can be obtained through charring of certain types of organic material (e.g., hazelnut shells, bamboo, chicken manure, etc.) in a pyrolysis unit. A similar energy source is terra preta nova.
- Chemurgy

Finally, urine can also be used as a basis to generate hydrogen (which is an energy carrier). Using urine, hydrogen production is 332% more energy efficient than using water.

Electricity distribution could be improved so to make use of a more structured electricity line arrangement and universal AC power plugs and sockets (e.g., the CEE 7/7 plug or IEC 60906-1 connectors). In addition, a universal system of electricity provisioning (e.g., universal voltage, frequency, ampère; e.g., 230 V with 50 Hz), as well as perhaps a better mains power system (e.g., through the use of special systems as perfected single-wire earth returns; e.g., Tunisia's MALT-system, which features low costs and easy placement).

Electricity storage (which is required for autonomous energy systems) can be provided through appropriate technology solutions as deep-cycle and car-batteries (intermediate technology), long duration flywheels, electrochemical capacitors, compressed air energy storage (CAES), liquid nitrogen and pumped hydro. Many solutions for the developing world are sold as a single package, containing a (micro) electricity generation power plant and energy storage. Such packages are called remote-area power supply

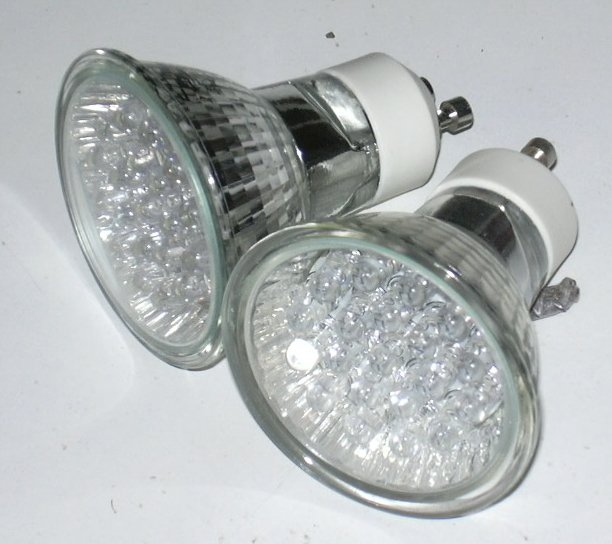
LED Lamp with GU10 twist lock fitting, intended to replace halogen reflector lamps.

- White LEDs and a source of renewable energy (such as solar cells) are used by the Light Up the World Foundation to provide lighting to poor people in remote areas, and provide significant benefits compared to the kerosene lamps which they replace. Certain other companies as Powerplus also have LED-flashlights with imbedded solar cells.
- Organic LEDs made by roll-to-roll production are another source of cheap light that will be commercially available at low cost by 2015.
- Compact fluorescent lamps (as well as regular fluorescent lamps and LED-lightbulbs) can also be used as appropriate technology. Although they are less environmentally friendly than LED-lights, they are cheaper and still feature relative high efficiency (compared to incandescent lamps).
- The Safe bottle lamp is a safer kerosene lamp designed in Sri Lanka. Lamps as these allow relative long, mobile, lighting. The safety comes from a secure screw-on metal lid, and two flat sides which prevent it from rolling if knocked over. An alternative to fuel or oil-based lanterns is the Uday lantern, developed by Philips as part of its Lighting Africa project (sponsored by the World Bank Group).
- The Faraday flashlight is an LED flashlight which operates on a capacitor. Recharging can be done by manual winching or by shaking, hereby avoiding the need of any supplementary electrical system.
- HID-lamps finally can be used for lighting operations where regular LED-lighting or other lamps will not suffice. Examples are car headlights. Due to their high efficiency, they are quite environmental, yet costly, and they still require polluting materials in their production process.

== Transportation ==
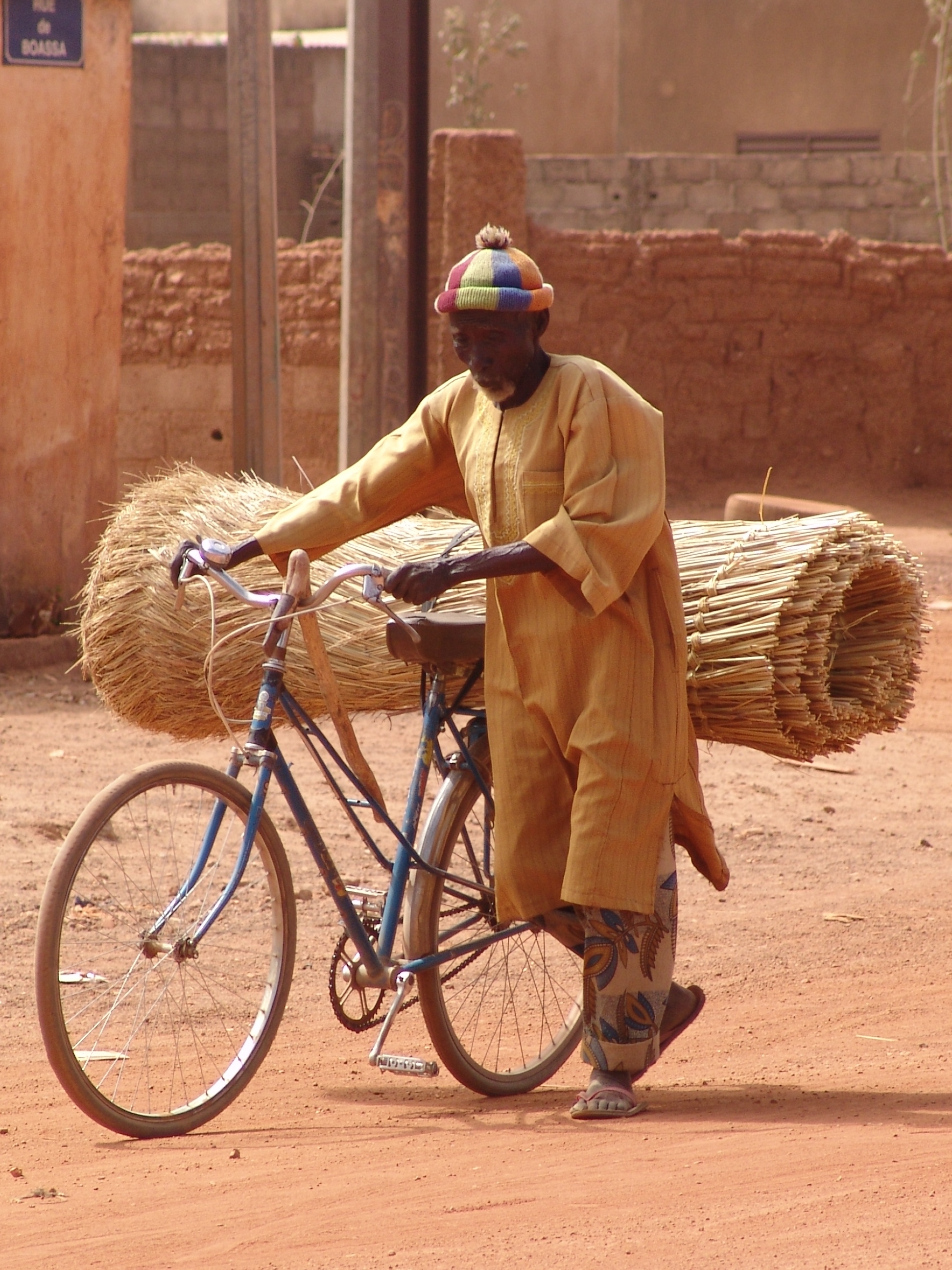
A man uses a bicycle to cargo goods in Ouagadougou, Burkina Faso (2007)

Human powered-vehicles include the bicycle (and the bamboo bicycle), which provides general-purpose transportation at lower costs compared to motorized vehicles, and many advantages over walking, and the whirlwind wheelchair, which provides mobility for disabled people who cannot afford the expensive wheelchairs used in developed countries. Animal powered vehicles/transport may also be another appropriate technology. Certain zero-emissions vehicles may be considered appropriate transportation technology, including light rail, compressed air cars, liquid nitrogen and hydrogen-powered vehicles. Also, vehicles with internal combustion engines may be converted to hydrogen or oxyhydrogen combustion.

Bicycles can also be applied to commercial transport of goods to and from remote areas. An example of this is Karaba, a free-trade coffee co-op in Rwanda, which uses 400 modified bicycles to carry hundreds of pounds of coffee beans for processing. Other projects for developing countries include the redesign of cycle rickshaws to convert them to electric power. However recent reports suggest that these rickshaws are not plying on the roads.

== Health care ==
According to the Global Health Council, rather than the use of professionally schooled doctors, the training of villagers to remedy most maladies in towns in the developing world is most appropriate. Trained villagers are able to eliminate 80% of the health problems. Small (low-cost) hospitals – based on the model of the Jamkhed hospital – can remedy another 15%, while only 5% will need to go to a larger (more expensive) hospital.

- Before being able to determine the cause of the disease or malady, accurate diagnosis is required. This may be done manually (through observation, inquiries) and by specialized tools.
- A phase-change incubator, developed in the late 1990s, is a low-cost way for health workers to incubate microbial samples.
- Birth control is also seen as an appropriate technology, especially now, because of increasing population numbers (overpopulating certain areas), increasing food prices and poverty. It has been proposed to a certain degree by PATH (program for appropriate technology in health).
- Jaipur foot was developed by Dr. P. K. Sethi and Masterji Ram Chander in 1968 as an inexpensive prosthetic leg for victims of landmine explosions.
- The Leveraged Freedom Chair is a low-cost wheelchair designed specifically for rough terrain
- Natural cleaning products can be used for personal hygiene and cleaning of clothing and eating utensils; in order to decrease illnesses/maladies (as they eliminate a great amount of pathogens).

Note that many Appropriate Technologies benefit public health, in particular by providing sanitation and safe drinking water. Refrigeration may also provide a health benefit. (These are discussed in the following paragraphs.) This was too found at the Comprehensive Rural Health Project and the Women Health Volunteers projects in countries as Iran, Iraq and Nepal.

== Food preparation and storage ==
Some proven intensive, low-effort food-production systems include urban gardening (indoors and outdoors). Indoor cultivation may be set up using hydroponics with Grow lights, while outdoor cultivation may be done using permaculture, forest gardening, no-till farming, Do Nothing Farming, etc. In order to better control the irrigation outdoors, special irrigation systems may be created as well (although this increases costs, and may again open the door to cultivating non-indigenous plants; something which is best avoided). One such system for the developing world is discussed here.

Crop production tools are best kept simple (reduces operating difficulty, cost, replacement difficulties and pollution, when compared to motorized equipment). Tools can include scythes, animal-pulled plows (although no-till farming should be preferred), dibbers, wheeled augers (for planting large trees), kirpis, hoes, etc.

Greenhouses are also sometimes included (see Earthship Biotincture). Sometimes they are also fitted with irrigation systems, and/or heat sink-systems which can respectively irrigate the plants or help to store energy from the sun and redistribute it at night (when the greenhouse starts to cool down).

According to proponents, Appropriate Technologies can greatly reduce the labor required to prepare food, compared to traditional methods, while being much simpler and cheaper than the processing used in Western countries. This reflects E. F. Schumacher's concept of "intermediate technology," i.e., technology which is significantly more effective and expensive than traditional methods, but still an order of magnitude (10 times) cheaper than developed world technology. Key examples are:

- the Malian peanut sheller
- the fonio husking machine
- the screenless hammer mill
- the ISF corn mill
- the ISF rice huller
- all other types of electrical or hand-operated kitchen equipment (grinders, cutters, etc.) Special multifunctional kitchen robots that are able to perform several functions (e.g., grinding, cutting, and even vacuum cleaning and polishing) are able to reduce costs even more. An example of these devices was the (now discontinued) Piccolo household appliance from Hammelmann Werke (previously based in Bad Kissingen). It was equipped with a flexible axis, allowing a variety of aids to be screwed on.

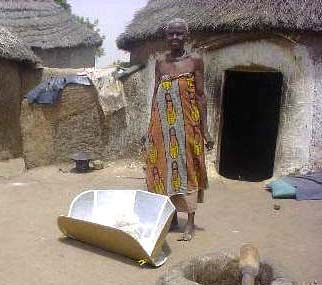
In Ghana, Zouzugu villagers use solar cookers for preparing their meals

- Solar cookers are appropriate to some settings, depending on climate and cooking style. They are emission-less and very low-cost. Hybrid variants also exist that incorporate a second heating source such as electrical heating or wood-based.
- Hot plates are 100% electrical, fairly low cost (around €20) and are mobile. They do however require an electrical system to be present in the area of operation.
- Rocket stoves and certain other woodstoves (e.g., Philips Woodstove) improve fuel efficiency, and reduce harmful indoor air pollution. The stoves however still make use of wood. However, briquette makers can now turn organic waste into fuel, saving money and/or collection time, and preserving forests.
- Solar, special Einstein refrigerators and thermal mass refrigerators reduce the amount of electricity required. Also, solar and special Einstein refrigerators do not use haloalkanes (which play a key role in ozone depletion), but use heat pumps or mirrors instead. Solar refrigerators have been built for developing nations by Sopology.
- The pot-in-pot refrigerator is an African invention which keeps things cool without electricity. It provides a way to keep food and produce fresh for much longer than would otherwise be possible. This can be a great benefit to the families who use the device. For example, it is claimed that girls who had to regularly sell fresh produce in the market can now go to school instead, as there is less urgency to sell the produce before it loses freshness.

== Information and communication technologies ==
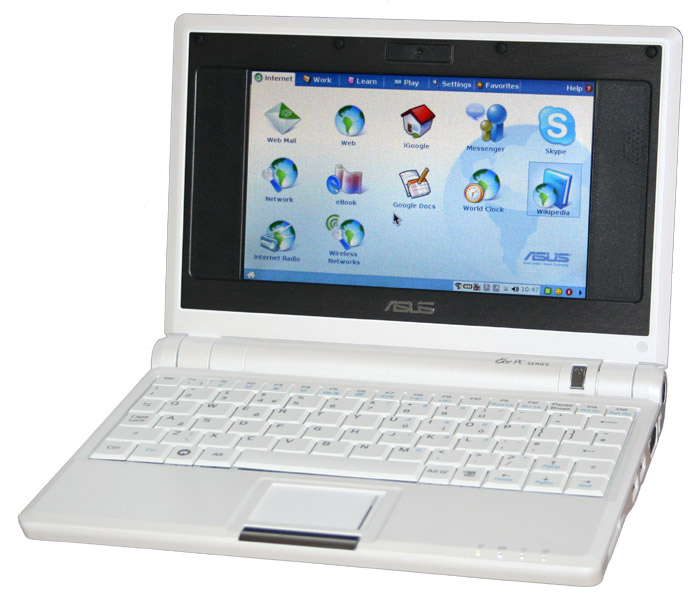
Netbooks such as the Asus Eee PC accommodate low-cost information sharing and communication

- The OLPC XO, Simputer, Asus Eee PC, and other low-cost computers are computers aimed at developing countries. Besides the low price, other characteristics include resistance to dust, reliability and use of the target language.
- Eldis OnDisc and The Appropriate Technology Library are projects that use CDs and DVDs to give access to development information in areas without reliable and affordable internet access.
- The wind-up radio and the computer and communication system planned by the Jhai Foundation are independent from power supply.
- There is also GrameenPhone, which fused mobile telephony with Grameen Bank's microfinance program to give Bangladeshi villagers access to communication.
- Mobile telephony is appropriate technology for many developing countries, as it greatly reduces the infrastructure required to achieve widespread coverage. However, mobile phone network may not always be available (it depends on the location) and may not always provide both voice and data services.
- Loband, a website developed by Aptivate, strips all the photographic and other bandwidth-intensive content from webpages and renders them as simple text, while otherwise allowing one to browse them normally. The site greatly increases the speed of browsing, and is appropriate for use on low bandwidth connections as generally available in much of the developing world.
- An increasing number of activists provide free or very inexpensive web and email services using cooperative computer networks that run wireless ad hoc networks. Network service is provided by a cooperative of neighbors, each operating a router as a household appliance. These minimize wired infrastructure, and its costs and vulnerabilities. Private IP networks set up in this way can operate without the use of a commercial provider.
- Rural electrical grids can be wired with "optical phase cable", in which one or more of the steel armor wires are replaced with steel tubes containing fiber optics.
- Satellite Internet access can provide high speed connectivity to remote locations, however these are significantly more expensive than wire-based or terrestrial wireless systems. Wimax and forms of packet radio can also be used. Depending on the speed and latency of these networks they may be capable of relaying VoIP traffic, negating the need for separate telephony services. Finally, the Internet Radio Linking Project provides potential for blending older (cheap) local radio broadcasting with the increased range of the internet.
- Satellite-based telephone systems can also be used, as either fixed installations or portable handsets and can be integrated into a PABX or local IP-based network.

== Finance ==
Through financial systems envisioned especially for the very poor/developed world, many companies have been able to get started with only limited capital. Often banks lend the money to people wishing to start a business (such as with microfinance). In other systems, people for a Rotating Savings and Credit Association or ROSCA to purchase costly material together (such as Tontines and Susu accounts). Organisations, communities, cities or individuals can provide loans to other communities/cities (such as with the approach followed by Kiva, World Vision Microloans, MicroPlace and LETS). Finally, in certain communities (usually isolated communities such as small islands or oases) everything of value is shared. This is called gift economy.

The adopters and implementers of a technology often have less bargaining and social power than those who design and provide the technology. In stakeholder negotiations and relationships, the uneven distribution of power often stems from the lack of access to capital. In the case of small-holder farming communities, for example, farmers struggle to access initial capital, and so outside investors have significantly more bargaining power. This dynamic gives power to outside investors over farmers, technology adopters, and local community members. A local community's best interest might not always be considered by outside investing forces.
