= U8 =

U8 may refer to:

- U8 (Berlin U-Bahn), a line on the Berlin U-Bahn
- U8 Global Student Partnership for Development
- German submarine U-8, one of several German submarines
- Yangwang U8, a luxury SUV by BYD Auto
- the IATA code for Armavia airline
- another designation for the Beechcraft L-23 Seminole
- Ultima VIII: Pagan, a video game
- u8, a name for the 8-bit unsigned integer, especially in Rust

== See also ==
- 8U (disambiguation)
