= Concordis international =

Non-profit organization

Concordis International is a non-profit organization (UK Charity Commission Number 1105697) that works alongside and in support of official peace processes. They exist to improve the potential for lasting peace. The organization has headquarters in London and country-offices in the Central African Republic and Nouakchott, Mauritania. Concordis' historical roots are in peace-building work by the Newick Park Initiative in South Africa (1986–1991) and in post-genocide Rwanda (1994–1997).

Much of Concordis’ work now focuses on the Sahel Region as well as on Sudan and South Sudan, where, initially as Relationships Foundation International, the organization has been working since 1999. Today, Concordis is focused primarily on Mauritania where it has been working long-term on a peace building mission between communities in the Senegal River Valley and building resilience to climate change through the resolution of conflicts related to land. Other programs by Concordis involve the reconciliation of local communities following the electoral crisis in Côte d'Ivoire, working for peaceful coexistence in the Central African Republic, and a number of missions in other countries, including Nigeria and Kenya. There is a strong emphasis on gender awareness within programs: in Sudan and South Sudan respectively women have played a prominent role in the process, while other projects include specific activities for women and recognize their important role in peace-building.

== Methodology ==
Concordis International's methodology rests on three pillars:

1. Conflict analysis to inform the design of projects and help all those involved in resolving the conflict
2. Facilitating dialogue between and across different levels of society on different sides engaged in or affected by violent conflicts. The dialogue focuses on the issues surrounding the causes and consequences of conflicts and is informed by expert contributions and research. The aim of this is to:
  - Build trust across lines of conflict and social divisions
  - Facilitate consensus building on the basis of shared interest
  - Contribute positively to negotiation processes
  - Create the climate for more general peaceful relations
3. Building resilience to ensure a lasting peace after the time of intervention

Concordis’ work is guided by:

- A commitment to justice and reconciliation
- Conscious impartiality as a facilitator
- Recognition of the need for sustained, long-term engagement.

== Work in Sudan and South Sudan ==
Concordis International's work in Sudan and South Sudan has aimed to facilitate informal dialogue, providing a forum where North and South Sudanese representatives can work together on key issues. Grounded in ten previous years of sustained peace-building engagement, the 2-year Sudanese Peace-Building Initiative (PBI), primarily funded by the European Union, lasted from January 2009 to December 2010 and, in cooperation with a number of Sudanese partners, increasingly focused on the development of cooperative, secure and economically viable relations across Sudan's north–south border.

Concordis’ work on Darfur started soon after the Darfur conflict broke out in 2003. A series of inclusive consultations were held in 2004–5 on land use and tenure, on cultural, political and economic marginalisation of the region and also on enabling the sustainable and safe return as well as integration of the displaced. After the signature of the Darfur Peace Accord in 2006, Concordis worked with senior Darfurians, the African Union and others to develop Darfurian unity as a foundation for a lasting settlement. Concordis has also worked in partnership with the Sudan Inter-Religious Council (SIRC) to develop the capacity of Sudanese religious leaders of different faiths, from across the country, to cooperate in promoting and facilitating peace and reconciliation.

From 2014 onwards Concordis has been working actively in the Abyei Administrative Area that lies between Sudan and South Sudan. Concordis has been working in the area with a view to reducing the enmity between the transhumant herder groups and settled farmers, promoting a return to peaceful co-existence and initiating cooperative development. In February 2016 a joint meeting took place between the two communities, attended by over 700 delegates, at which a 20-member Joint Community Peace Committee (JCPC) was formed. On 9 April 2015 4 Ngok Dinka children abducted during a raid by Misseriya tribesmen on a village in Abyei were released into Concordis’ custody in exchange for 8 prisoners held by UNISFA as a result of the attack. At the handover, Misseriya Paramount Chief, Amir Hamdi Dudu, said: ‘It was the work of Concordis that compelled me to bring these children’. These children have been re-united with their family.

== Work in Kenya ==
Concordis International's work in Kenya focused on policy-makers from the national to the community level and aimed to encourage dialogue on land reform as Kenya started to implement a New Land Policy. Consultations to promote reconciliation and reduce the threat of renewed violent conflict in Kenya were held in partnership with the Sychar Centre and the Institute for the Study of African Realities, both in Nairobi.

== Work in Côte d'Ivoire ==
In March 2012, Ivorian Dialogue, Truth and Reconciliation Commission sought out Concordis’ help in engaging the diaspora in London, Paris and New York in the peace process. Following this work, a second programme was developed to work in partnership with an Ivorian umbrella civil society organisation, CSCI (La Convention de la Society Civile Ivoirienne), CSCI's 133 member organisations and with the NGO TearFund. It was carried out in the regions around Korhogo in the north, Duékoué in the west, Bondoukou in the east and Bouake in the centre.

== Work in Mauritania ==
Concordis has been working in Mauritania in partnership with Mauritanian umbrella civil society organisation FONADH since April 2013. The work focuses on resolving land-related issues between different communities living in the Senegal River Valley. This is done through training local mediators to facilitate dialogues between local communities, building the capacities of members of civil society organizations, facilitating higher-level policy workshops with policymakers and civil society leaders, supporting local agriculture cooperatives -especially women's cooperatives, and training participants in about the sustainable management of socioeconomic activities.

During the 2015-2017 phase of the programme, Concordis used cartography to map out land in dispute. A cartography report, summarising the needs and interests of all sections of each community, is now being used to articulate those needs to the agencies with power to deliver solutions.

== Work in the Central African Republic ==
Since 2018, Concordis is currently working on a 3-year programme in the Central African Republic, funded by the EU Bêkou Trust and the UK government. Work is carried out in the prefecture of Ouham-Pendé, which is at the heart of important transhumance corridors between Cameroon, Chad, and the Central African Republic. The programme focuses on the resolution of tensions linked to pastoral migration and of tensions among and within local communities.

== Involvement Elsewhere ==
Concordis conducted background research and an assessment of conflict in Afghanistan in 2003 prior to a visit there in January 2004. Concordis has maintained a modest level of research and networking on Afghanistan for several years and has been involved in the Afghan/Canadian-led Pathways To Peace project. Concordis assisted the Annapolis Friends Peace and Justice Center with expert advice on its work with the Palestinian/Israeli Geneva Initiative, bringing Palestinian and Israeli participants together for three days of intensive discussions in August 2008 on the difficult issue of access to water supplies. Concordis held a consultation in 2009 on the role of churches in the Israeli-Palestinian conflict, bringing together experts and leaders from UK churches. Concordis has undertaken in-depth research and confidential partnering discussions in other areas and also contributes to conflict analysis and public awareness, informing different groups about the complexities of conflict.

== Networks and Partnerships ==
Concordis International has cooperated with several other agencies, often acting in partnerships. Concordis is a member of the following networks:

Advocates for International Development (A4ID)

Alliance for Peacebuilding

British Overseas Network for Development (BOND)

The Humanitarian Centre, Cambridge, UK

The Jubilee House Forum

Concordis has worked with the following local partners:

Sudan and South Sudan

- Nasaq, a journalism training centre based in Khartoum
- Sudan Inter-Religious Council (SIRC)
- Sudan Organisation for Nonviolence and Development (SONAD)
- Social and Human Development Consultancy Group (SAHDCG)
- Center for Peace and Development Studies, University of Juba (CPDS)

Kenya

- The Sychar Centre
- Institute for the Study of African Realities (ISAR)

Afghanistan

- Pathways to Peace Consortium with University of Kabul, Peacebuild and 3P Human Security

Côte d'Ivoire

- CSCI (Convention de la Société Civile Ivoirienne)

Mauritania

- FONADH (Forum des Organisations Nationales des Droits Humains en Mauritanie)
