= Centre for Global Equality =

The Centre for Global Equality (formerly The Humanitarian Centre) is a Cambridge-based hub organization which works to bring together local humanitarian organisations and societies, providing a local network and resources. Its website claims it is "a Cambridge based hub organisation that 'thinks local and acts global', sharing complementary resources and skills to achieve more than the sum of its parts".

It is listed on the Charity Commission web page number 1121067, where the charity's financial details can be found.

The Centre for Global Equality is Company Limited by Guarantee in England and Wales; Company number 6080896, Registered Charity number 1121067.

== History ==
The Centre for Global Equality began from informal meetings of local NGOs, charities and student organisations in Cambridge whence opportunities for more formal collaboration have arisen.

In September 2006 a full-time post was established and office space was made available at Fenner's sports centre through the University of Cambridge. Financial support was secured through the support of the Sir Halley Stuart Trust.

Further support in recent years has come from University of Cambridge Active Community Fund and Society Syndicate, Isaac Newton Trust, The Golden Bottle Trust, BT Community Awards, and a number of Cambridge Colleges.

In addition, the Isaac Newton Trust and Cambridge Careers Service have supported interns carrying out activities at the Centre for Global Equality.

== Education ==
The Centre for Global Equality provides diploma courses in International Development to students, professionals and others. It also hosts an annual lecture on the theme of International Development, and stocks a library of International Development related publications.

Additionally The Centre for Global Equality is developing an online library of talks and lectures given at events. Some of these may also be found on iTunes.

== Member organizations ==
- Afrinspire
- Addenbrooke's Abroad
- Aptivate
- Architectures Sans Frontieres
- Bridges to Belarus
- Cambridge to Africa
- Camvol
- CBM-UK
- CUiD
- Development in Action
- Education Partnerships Africa (Formerly KEP)
- Engineers Without Borders
- ELST
- Global Poverty Project
- Harambee Centre
- HoverAid
- Kiwaja.net
- Menelik Education
- The Mountain Trust
- Naari
- NECT
- New Foundations
- Oxfam Cambridge
- RedR Cambridge
- Shelter Centre
- SSSK
- VSO Cambridge
- WDM Cambridge
