= Michelman =

Michelman is a surname. Notable people with the surname include:

- Eric Michelman, American inventor of the mouse scroll-wheel
- Frank Michelman (born 1936), American law professor
- Kate Michelman (born 1942), American political activist
- Ken Michelman (born 1955), American actor
