= Development in Action =

Development in Action logo

Development in Action (DiA) is a small UK international development non-governmental organization run "by young people for young people". Its main objective is to promote global citizenship by encouraging engagement in global issues amongst young people in the UK.

The charity offers 5-month (Sept-Feb) and 2-month (July-Sept) volunteer placements in India. During their placements, candidates get hands-on experience of grassroots development, and are encouraged to engage in the wider issues of global citizenship and sustainable development. Each volunteer is supported in the planning and production of a 'DIA Project.'

== Activities ==
The Development in Action programme achieves its aims through:

- The DiA placement scheme, which provides opportunities for volunteers to learn about, and participate in the work of its various partner organisations in India. Activities include teaching, field work/research, child-care, health education and administrative work. In every placement, the aim is for the volunteer to learn from and with their fellow workers and the local community.
- The volunteer 'DIA Project', where each volunteer is encouraged to produce a project/develop resources during their time in India. This can be in any form that the volunteer feels is appropriate to their material and theme, although DiA suggests different methods and approaches during training. Past volunteers have worked on activity worksheets, articles, information sheets and photography stretching over a variety of topics such as recycling, solar energy, children's position in the community and the empowerment of women. Volunteers also use their DiA resources and the experiences they have gained from the volunteer placements in India for development education activities in the UK.
- A DIA newsletter which is produced quarterly and is a product of volunteers experiences and knowledge from India, DiA activities in the UK, topical educational development activities in the UK and the voice of our partner organisations in India. The publication aims to facilitate increased understanding of international issues to a broad-based audience.

== History ==
DiA sprang from a gap year scheme in which student volunteers taught English in village schools in Western Madhya Pradesh, India. The organiser was retiring, but the local communities in India and the participating volunteers wanted to continue the programme. In February 1992, while still in India, the volunteers and locals began to plan a new scheme to continue the link. 'Student Action India' was founded, and in 2004 it changed its name to 'Development in Action.

Development in Action is a registered charity in the UK (No. 1037554) and it is part of the Make Poverty History campaign.

Development in Action is a member of the Humanitarian Centre.

== Awards ==
Recent Development in Action recruitment campaign

DiA won the national prize of Youth Clubs UK for "International Awareness", and received an award from Lord Westminster at St. James' Palace, November 1995.

== See also ==
- Make Poverty History
- International development
- India
