= IIH =

IIH can refer to:

- Idiopathic intracranial hypertension
- Innovations in International Health, an innovation platform that facilitates multidisciplinary research to develop medical technologies for developing world settings
- Transcription factor II H
- Instituto de Investigaciones Históricas (Institute of Historical research), a research institute of the National Autonomous University of Mexico
- International Institute for Hermeneutics
