= More Than Scientists =

Outreach program for climate scientists

- Founded: 2015; 11 years ago
- Type: Non-profit
- Purpose: Environmentalism
- Location: Seattle, WA, United States
- Region served: Worldwide
- Website: www.morethanscientists.org

More Than Scientists is a United States-based nonprofit environmental advocacy group. It provides an outreach program for climate scientists to speak publicly about their personal views on climate change. Directed towards the general public, its goal has been to communicate that climate change is real and what it will mean for society.

The program presents videos contributed by climate scientists featuring them speaking directly to the viewer. Launched in 2015 with contributions by more than 30 climate scientists, it has grown to more than 80 participating climate scientists and more than 300 videos (as of 2023).

Prominent climate scientists who have recorded and contributed videos to More Than Scientists include Kerry Emanuel, John Wallace, Michael Mann, Katharine Hayhoe, Naomi Oreskes, and Kevin Trenberth among others. These scientists represent leading climate science departments including MIT, University of Washington, Harvard, and University of Colorado Boulder. Research centers they work at include the National Center for Atmospheric Research (NCAR), the National Oceanic and Atmospheric Administration (NOAA), the Cooperative Institute for Research in Environmental Sciences (CIRES), the Institute of Arctic and Alpine Research (INSTAAR), Western Water Assessment (WWA), the National Snow and Ice Data Center (NSIDC), and the Laboratory for Atmospheric and Space Physics (LASP).

The More Than Scientists' videos focus on the societal and personal effects of climate change, rather than presenting the science per se. "Scientists... showcase their human reasons for concern about climate change, rather than the logical, methodological – and often hard to understand – voice often heard in television interviews or jargon scientific papers." reports the World Economic Forum. As Cool Davis described, "These scientists who work in climate-related disciplines don't spew facts and figures, but rather tell the personal concerns that those facts and figures have led them to. They talk about the potential impact of climate change on their families, their communities and the environment."

== Public awareness of climate change consensus ==
At the time of More Than Scientists' launch in 2015 there was a substantial gulf between climate scientists' understanding of human-caused climate change ("anthropogenic global warming" or AGW as it was generally put at that time) and the general public's view of the scientists' research conclusions. In 2013 97% of climate scientists viewed human-caused climate change as the reality, yet less than 10% of the public was aware of that consensus.

At the same time, there was a relatively high level of trust in climate scientists. The Yale Project on Climate Change Communication reported in 2015 that 70% of the public trusts climate scientists for information about global warming, slightly ahead of family and friends (67%) and well ahead of then President Obama (42%) and mainstream news media (41%).

With this background, there was increasing interest in the climate science community regarding communication with the general public about their research findings. "While there have been strong voices contributing to advancing this conversation, we believe voices of the scientists are critically needed to help dispel confusion about the science." reported Climate Access. And "Scientists have a sentinel responsibility to alert society to threats about which ordinary people have no other way of knowing." argues Naomi Oreskes, Harvard Professor of the History of Science and Affiliated Professor of Earth and Planetary Sciences and More Than Scientists contributor. According to Union of Concerned Scientists member and More Than Scientists contributor Gretchen Goldman, "The More Than Scientists campaign is a great example of the kind of outlet for which the UCS Science Network provides resources to help scientists communicate."

== Areas of Focus ==
More Than Scientists focuses on these primary topics: Impacts on ecosystems, Impacts on food supply, Impacts on forests, Impacts on society, Impacts on the ocean, Impacts on the water supply, Impacts on storms and natural disasters, Impacts on families, Impacts on future generations, Adaptation to climate change. In addition, many of the videos provide personal introductions to the scientists themselves.

== History ==
More Than Scientists was founded by Eric Michelman, its director, and Dargan Frierson, associate professor of atmospheric sciences at the University of Washington. Free Range Studios led the campaign strategy, website development, and introduction.
