= U8 Global Student Partnership for Development =

International university student network

U8 logo

The U8 Global Student Partnership for Development was a student-led global university network. Founded in 2005 by students in the wake of the Make Poverty History campaign, it provided an impartial platform for students to learn, share ideas and attempt to make a positive impact on the least developed parts of the world. It had as many as 50 member universities in countries such as Bulgaria, Ethiopia, India, Tanzania and the UK. The U8 sought to work towards a world of in which leaders and professionals understand and engage with international development issues. The U8 disbanded in 2011.

== History ==
The U8 was founded in July 2005 by university students Sheena Sumaria and Natasha Hughes, after meeting during a summer internship at the UK Department for International Development (DfID). Their idea was to set up an inclusive global platform connecting students interested in development to raise awareness, spark debate and activism and to enhance knowledge of key challenges in social issues around the world. They worked together with students from various universities across the UK to develop the idea and make the U8 a reality.

The concept of the U8 was born during the time of the G8 Summit in Gleneagles, Scotland, where the leaders of world’s eight richest countries gathered to discuss global challenges. In contrast, the U8 aimed to give a voice to students from developing countries about issues that concerned them most and to create a culture of inclusion in developmental dialogue and policy.

The U8 derives its name from the G8. It presents an alternative to the structure of the G8, which gives rise to an annual meeting of the world’s richest countries.

In contrast to the G8 however, the U8 is not restricted to the world’s richest countries, but aims to link students from developed and developing countries to engage in a shared learning process. Membership is not restricted to top universities, but is open to all.

== Activities ==
The U8 arena allowed for sustained, unbounded discussion both online and face-to-face at local, national and international levels. It was hoped that by connecting students from around the globe, their understanding of complex issues and their ability to reflect upon, appraise and challenge policy and practice will be increased. Local activities include speaker events, such as the Warwick International Development Summit, and skills-based courses such as the Cambridge (in affiliation with CUiD) and Oxford University International Development Courses, which are organised by member groups. Global activities, are based around four pillars:

1. Research - online, collaborative projects, proposed by members and carried out via online communication. The outcomes are published online and usually take the form of research documents. Research outcomes from 2005 were submitted to the UK Department for International Development's 2005 White Paper, and a paper from 2006 was published in an Indian university journal.

2. Discussion - hosted on the online forums, where members can propose or join existing debates on topical issues. The monthly "Veritas" focus topic is used to provoke thoughts and debate, and there are also "Feature Forums" where high-profile development professionals reply to members' posts on a particular topic.

3. Blogs - Written by members and professionals on development issues.

4. Writing - Articles are published online and in an annual print publication, which has been designed by students from Anglia Ruskin University, Cambridge, for the past two years.

== Aims ==
1. Shared Learning - To facilitate learning partnerships based on knowledge-exchange and joint-analysis of development issues.

2. Promoting a Culture of Inclusion - To be inclusive to different levels of knowledge, cultural perspectives, and academic disciplines.

3. Engagement with Stakeholders and Policy Makers - To understand their objectives and practices. We work with professional organisations as equal partners to achieve shared objectives. We aim to provide students with opportunities to take part in policy discussions and deliver their own recommendations.

4. Promoting awareness and understanding of development issues.
