= 8U =

8U or 8-U may refer to:

- 8U, IATA code for Afriqiyah Airways
- One of the possible sizes of a rack unit
- F8U, a model of Vought F-8 Crusader
- RG-8U, a type of coaxial cable
- HP 8U, Roman-8 character set by Hewlett-Packard

== See also ==
- U8 (disambiguation)
