= Cambridge University International Development =

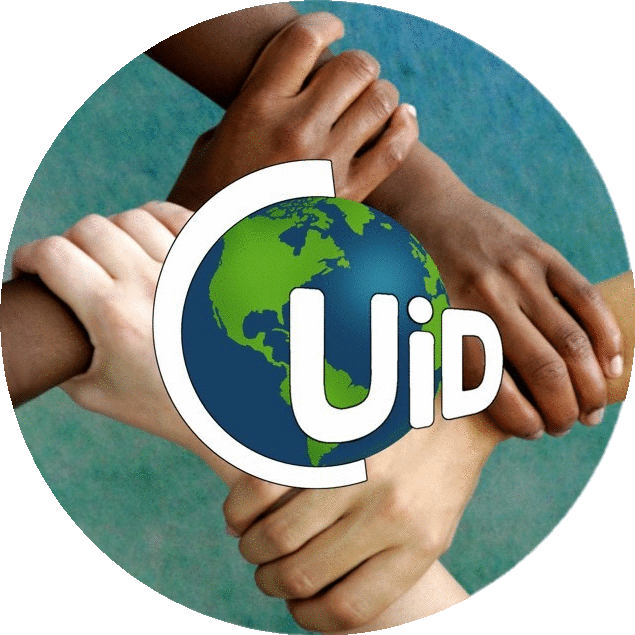
CUiD's logo

Cambridge University International Development or CUiD is a student run society aiming to promote awareness and discussion of international development issues across Cambridge. This is primarily achieved through events and the Vision magazine which is published termly.

== History ==
CUiD was founded in 2005 by Sheena Sumaria, a student of St John's College, Cambridge with the goal of 'Raising awareness and increasing understanding of the issues surrounding International Development' and since then has been rapidly expanding every year. Now its membership base is over 1,000, with a central committee of 15.

== Events ==
CUiD runs a series of events predominantly scheduled in the Michaelmas and Lent terms of the University of Cambridge. They include the following:

- Speaker events. Academics, professionals, media figures and others give their views on topics relating to international development. Previous speakers include Gerison Lansdown for UNICEF, Ko Aung on campaigning for human rights and democracy in Burma, Andrew Swinells on the Rwandan genocide and the search for justice, Richard Baker for Oxfam and many more.
- Panel debates. Designed to provoke discussion, and highlight differing opinion. Previous debates include "Corporate (Ir)responsibility?" and "Gap Year, Crap Year?"
- Film showings, sometimes followed by a speaker. Previous films include MSF's "Invisibles" and WORLDwrite's "Corruptababble"
- Discussion forums. To encourage everyone to air their opinion and discuss informally the issues surrounding international development.
- Socials. To create a network within Cambridge and to encourage a wider social group to get involved.

== Vision ==
Vision is CUiD's termly magazine which deals with concerns relating to international development. It is usually themed around a particular topic, for example "drugs and development" and is predominantly written by Cambridge University students.

== U8 ==
U8 logo

CUiD is a founding member of the U8. The U8 is a global network to link universities across the world to promote dialogue and share ideas.

== 2009 ==
2009 was Cambridge's 800th Anniversary, which CUiD celebrated with a special event and publication: Vision - Assessing our Legacy. This encompassed an art exhibition and an inaugural speech by Professor Keith Hart entitled "International Development: a Historical Perspective from Cambridge".

Furthermore, CUiD hosted the Cambridge International Development Summit (CIDs), whose speakers included Nick Dyer, Director of Policy, Department for International Development.
