= Innovations in International Health =

Innovations in International Health (IIH) was an innovation platform that facilitated multidisciplinary research to develop medical technologies for developing world settings at MIT. It was based at the Massachusetts Institute of Technology from 2008 through 2012. IIH's mission was to accelerate the development of appropriate and affordable health technologies by facilitating collaboration between researchers, users and health practitioners around the world.

IIH created a spin-off course that is still taught at MIT D-Lab called D-Lab Health, an interdisciplinary global health design and engineering course. Students learn about major global health challenges impacting the developing world and learn a set of design and prototyping tools to develop appropriate technologies to address these challenges. Students work closely with IIH partners CARE and CIES in Nicaragua to gain user feedback during the prototyping process. Projects from D-Lab Health include Ambuzap, BabyTracker, GlucoTank, Nebaul, and the POP bandage.

== History ==
IIH was founded in the summer of 2007 by Amy Smith and Aamir Khan and was directed by José Gómez-Márquez. Its first meeting brought together 12 investigators from 6 countries. IIH boasted a growing portfolio of inventions and launched devices and research studies in the United States, Nicaragua, Honduras, Peru, Tanzania, India and Pakistan.

IIH aggregated physical facilities, called H-Labs, at the Massachusetts Institute of Technology, the InterActive Research and Development headquarters in Karachi, Pakistan, and the Nicaraguan Center for Investigational Health Sciences in Managua.

== Community ==
IIH's community included scientists, health care workers, NGOs, international aid officials, public health researchers, businesspeople, and other partners from a wide range of disciplines. Their work spanned twelve R&D sites worldwide in fifteen technology projects across seven health fields.

IIH seeks to connect researchers around the world with several collaborative research tools, including a member-based social networking site, Collaboratorium (a graphical user interface that maps out fields of research and professional practice), Global Health Data Mining (statistical tools that identify areas of need in the realm of global health), and physical collaboration through conferences and meet-ups.

== Technologies ==
The IIH Accelerated Product Development (APD) framework turns research ideas into hands-on projects that involve clinical feasibility studies and trials. The APD also provides assistance in funding.

Some technologies featured at IIH included:

- The Vaccine Wheel: a paper craft application that gives parents an interactive way to track their children's immunizations.
- PortaTherm: a portable incubator that is light and affordable and can be used where electricity is unavailable and unreliable.
- Disposable Dermatomes: simplified, affordable dermatomes that use plastic cartridges as motors and regular razor blades for cutting.
- RespiRescue: a stand-alone emergency unit that treats sudden high-risk asthma attacks in remote areas far from emergency medical care.
- GlucoVend: a self-service kiosk for patients to check glucose levels and buy glucose pills if necessary.
- XoutTB: a system of ensuring adherence to tuberculosis medications using text messages and diagnostics. A trial of X Out TB was launched in Karachi, Pakistan in 2009.
- Solar autoclave: a solar-powered autoclave for sterilizing medical equipment.
- MEDIKit: a series of prototyping kits for medical professionals in developing countries which allow them to build and modify their own appropriate medical devices. Kit themes include drug delivery, diagnostics, microfluidics, vital signs, surgical instrumentation and prosthetics.
- Cool Comply: A solar powered refrigeration device used to store medication and monitor adherence for MDR-TB patients.

== Awards and recognition ==
IIH researchers and projects won several awards and have been recognized internationally by renowned publications and innovation- and health-oriented organizations. In 2009, Program Director José Gómez-Márquez was recognized as Humanitarian of the Year by Technology Review’s Young Innovators Under 35 issue. X out TB was profiled in an article by The Economist newspaper's Technology Monitor. Gómez-Márquez has won MIT's IDEAS Competition three times. (One of the winning inventions was XoutTB). The solar autoclave was lauded by former President Jimmy Carter. and featured by the World Health Organization in their Call for Innovative Technologies that Address Global Health Concerns. Cool Comply recently won a Harvard Catalyst Pilot Grant.
