= Chunche =

Kind of building used to make raisins

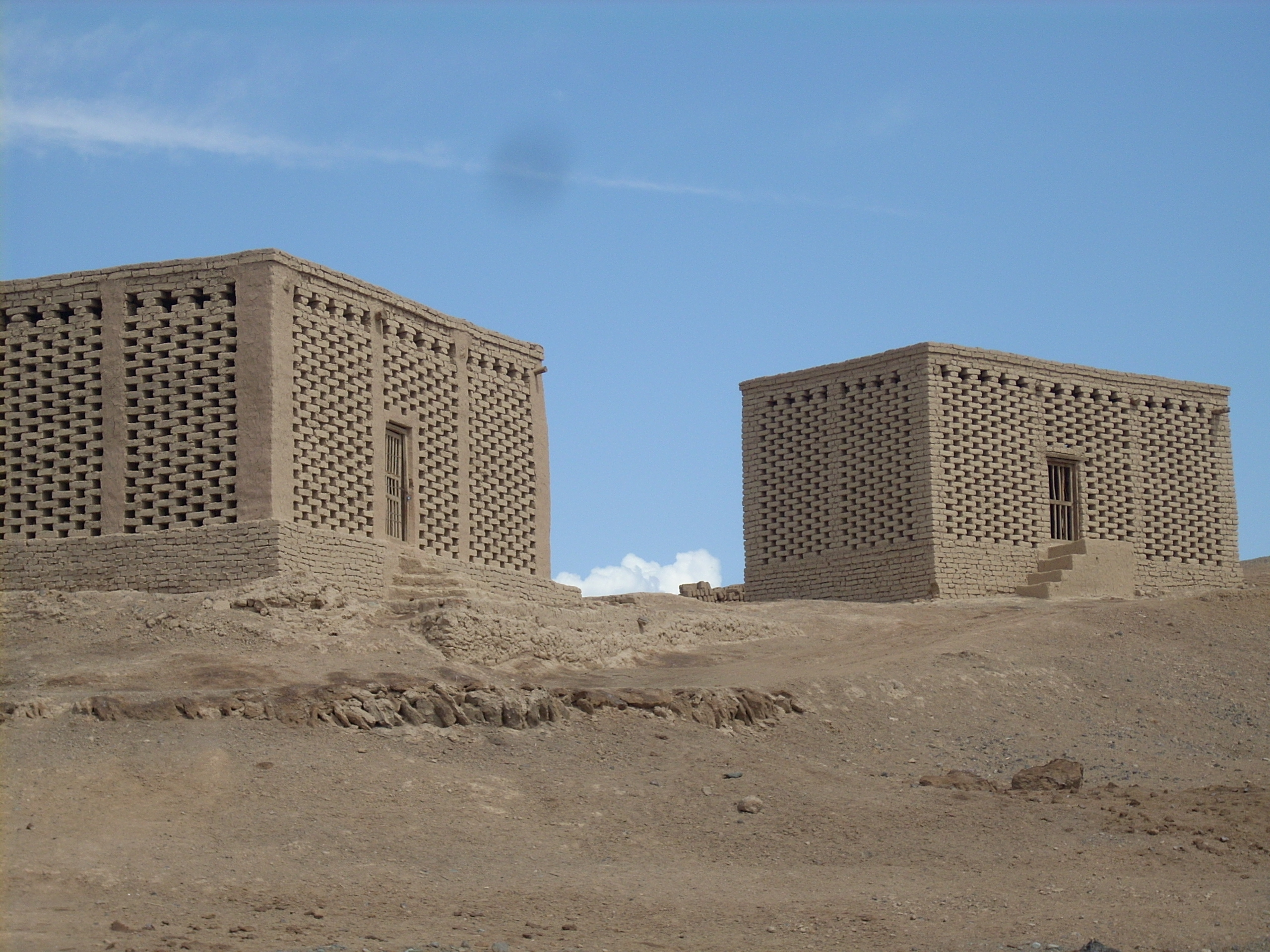
Chunche in Boyluq, Turpan

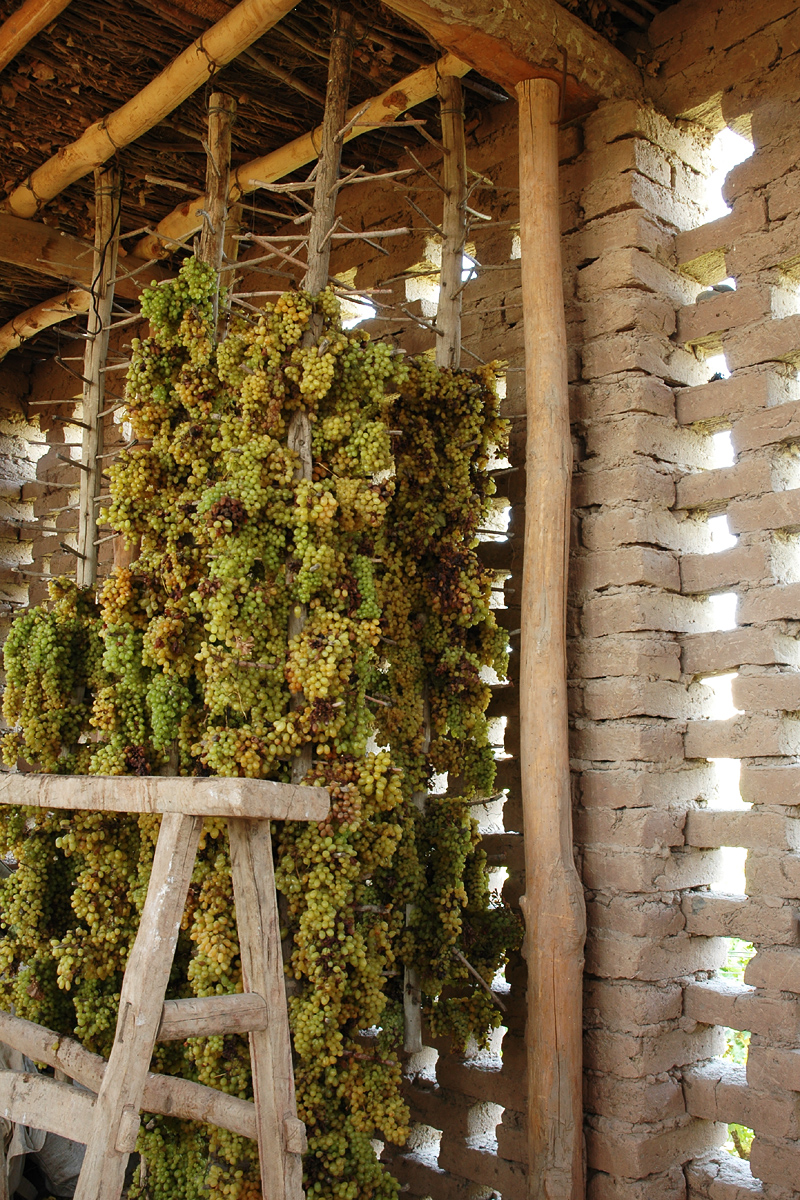
Hanging grapes being dried for raisins inside a Chunche

Chunche (Uyghur: چۈنچە, Чунчә; Chinese: 晾房, 阴房) is a Uyghur word that refers to a kind of building used to make raisins in Turpan, Xinjiang Uyghur Autonomous Region, China. The building has a dark interior, and the walls are covered with a large number of holes to allow wind to pass through and assist in the drying process through evaporation. Chunches are usually built in high, windy, areas due to the need for the wind.

These structures have long attracted attention of visitors to Turpan. The 19th-century Russian traveler Grigory Grum-Grshimailo wrote of Turpan:

Turfan is famous for its raisins, which one can deem to be the best in the world. They are dried in drying houses of a completely peculiar type.

In Turpan, raisins are primarily produced from seedless white grapes. The drying process takes about 40 days. Grapes that have been dried in a drying house (the "air-dried" kind) usually appear green or yellow, because of the shade, while grapes dried under direct sun appear dark.

Some raisin producers are reported to buy grapes elsewhere (e.g. in Hami) and bring them to Turpan to dry in the local chunche, as this drying method is believed to produce a superior product.

For 2009/2010, China's annual raisin production was forecasted by international expert at 155,000 metric tons (the largest in the world), of which 75% would come from Turpan.

== See also ==
- Grape Valley, the main grape growing area in Turpan
