= German submarine U-8 =

U-8 may refer to one of the following German submarines:

- SM U-8, a Type U 5 submarine launched in 1911 and that served in the First World War until sunk on 4 March 1915
  - During the First World War, Germany also had these submarines with similar names:
    - SM UB-8, a Type UB I submarine launched in 1915; transferred to Bulgaria on 25 March 1916; surrendered on 25 February 1919; broken up at Bizerte in August 1921
    - SM UC-8, a Type UC I submarine launched in 1915 and grounded on 4 November 1915
- German submarine U-8 (1935), a Type IIB submarine that served in the Second World War and was scuttled on 2 May 1945
- German submarine U-8 (S187), a Type 205 submarine of the Bundesmarine that was launched in 1964 and scrapped in 1974
