= Jose Gomez-Marquez =

Honduran inventor, researcher, and educator

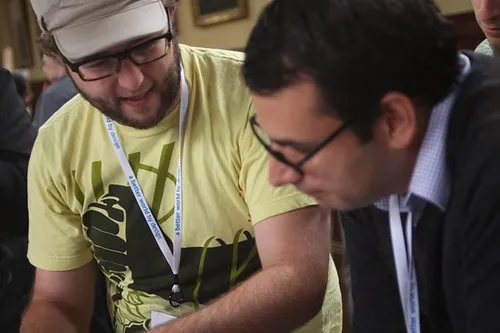
Mackenzie Cowell explains a cricket-leg sound wave recording device he made to Jose Gomez-Marquez (right) of MIT's D-Lab.

José Gomez-Marquez (born 1976) is a Honduran inventor, researcher, and educator and is best known for empowering medical professionals with MEDIkits.

== Early life and education ==
Before entering the United States, Gomez-Marquez was a native of Honduras. He is from a medical family, his grandfather was a surgeon who served in different hospitals in Tegucigalpa where Gomez-Marquez was raised.

== Career and research ==
Jose Gomez-Marquez observed inventive behaviors during his time in Nicaragua when hospital staff utilized unconventional materials such as cut-up soda bottles as drainage valves and layered surgical gauze, to create neonatal UV protectors. These experiences inspired his mission to empower inventiveness and access to tools in impoverished communities. Gomez-Marquez developed a way to extract parts from toys and use these to build medical instruments for children at low cost. He also designed a way for people to build their own diagnostic devices that can be put together inexpensively. Jose is the creator of the first course on affordable medical device hardware at MIT. In Little Devices Lab at MIT, he works on projects around the world.

== Awards and honors ==
Gomez-Marquez is a three-time MIT IDEAS Competition winner including two Lemelson Awards for International Technology. In 2009, he was named the Technology Review Humanitarian of the year and MIT Technology Review added him to the TR35 list of innovators under 35. In 2011, Gomez-Marquez was chosen as a TED Global Fellow.

== Selected publications ==
- Gomez-Marquez, Jose "Ampli: A Construction Set for Paperfluidic Systems" published 2018
- Jose Gomez-Marquez, Kimberly Hamad-Schifferli: "Distributed Biological Foundries for Global Health" published 2019
