= Aptivate =

British not-for-profit organisation

Aptivate is a NGO and not-for-profit organisation based in the United Kingdom. Aptivate combines best practices from the commercial software sector and the International Development sector to create ICT services that facilitate communication for unconnected communities, empowering ordinary people across the developing world to improve their lives.

Aptivate is notable for developing the open-source Loband website service. Formed on 1 December 2002; until December 2006 it was known as Aidworld.

Aptivate is a member of the Humanitarian Centre.

== Loband ==
Originally named Aidbase, developed in 2004, Loband is a service that simplifies web pages allowing them to download faster over slow Internet connections, particularly those in poor countries.

== History ==
Aptivate, formerly known as Aidworld, was first conceived in Nepal by two aid workers working with the United Nations High Commissioner for Refugees. They both had experience of the communications problems present in developing countries, and were trying to find a way of alleviating them. In collaboration with some technically minded friends, they founded Aidworld in 2002 with an initial focus on supporting the humanitarian aid sector.

In 2006, Aidworld changed its name to Aptivate. Since then, Aptivate has been working with other nonprofits, charities, NGOs, facilitators and trainers, web/software developers, and technical consultants.

2004

- Awarded £75,000 DTI SMART Award.
- Loband (then called Aidbase) pilot project in Kenya.

2005

- Loband version 2 implemented.
- The email service (later rebranded as Enclusion) launches at the World Summit on the Information Society in Tunisia.

2006

- Publishes guidelines for low bandwidth friendly websites.
- Aidworld renamed Aptivate.

2007

- Network for Information and Digital Access (NIDA) Website Launch
- INASP-backed web design guidelines produced.
- Interface project for UNFAO and WHO's research access programmes commences.

== See also ==
- Appropriate technology
