= Amy B. Smith =

American inventor and engineer

- Born: November 4, 1962 (age 63); Lexington, Massachusetts, U.S.
- Education: Massachusetts Institute of Technology
- Awards: MacArthur Fellowship
- Scientific career
- Workplaces: Peace Corps, Massachusetts Institute of Technology

Amy Smith (born November 4, 1962) is an American inventor, educator, and founder of the MIT D-Lab and senior lecturer of mechanical engineering at MIT.

== Early life and education ==
Smith was born in Lexington, Massachusetts. Her father, Arthur Smith, was an electrical engineering professor at MIT. Arthur Smith took his family to India for a year when Amy was growing up while he worked at a university there. "I think that set a lot of things in motion for her. It's very different from growing up in a Boston suburb", he said. Smith says that being exposed to severe poverty as a child made her want to do something to help kids around the world. "Living in India is something that stayed with me—I could put faces on the kids who had so little money."

Smith received her bachelor's degree in mechanical engineering from MIT in 1984. Smith returned to MIT after the Peace Corps to get her master's degree in mechanical engineering.

== Peace Corps service ==
Smith joined the Peace Corps serving four years as a volunteer in Botswana. During her Peace Corps service she was struck by the fact that "the most needy are often the least empowered to invent solutions to their problems." While she was serving in the middle of the Kalahari Desert, she decided what she wanted to do with the rest of her life. "At one point I had sort of an epiphany, sitting at my desk looking out over the bush, when I realized I wanted to do engineering for developing countries", Smith said. "In Botswana, I was teaching and then working for the ministry of agriculture as a beekeeper, and I remember thinking to myself that I really liked doing development work, but I wished could do some engineering too, because I like creative problem solving", says Smith. "People in the developing world scrape every last ounce of life that they can out of objects, and my students used to bring me things to fix, and I always enjoyed being able to do that."

== Academic career ==
She is a senior lecturer in the Department of Mechanical Engineering at MIT specializing in engineering design and appropriate technology for developing countries. She founded the MIT D-Lab program, which works with people around the world to develop and advance collaborative approaches and practical solutions to global poverty challenges. D-Lab's mission is pursued through an academics program of more than 20 MIT courses and student research and fieldwork opportunities; research groups spanning a variety of sectors and approaches; and a group of participatory innovation programs they call innovation practice.

She also co-founded Innovations in International Health to facilitate collaboration among researchers around the world to develop medical technologies for resource-poor settings. She teaches the courses SP.721/11.025: D-Lab: Development and SP.722/2.722: D-Lab Design. In the past, she has taught 2.72: Elements of Mechanical Design.

Smith encourages women to become engineers although she dislikes being referred to as a woman engineer. "Actually, because my class involves humanitarian engineering, I very rarely have more men than women. There have been times where there have been ten women and one man. This isn't surprising, given that women often want to see an application to what they're learning that they feel is worthwhile", says Smith. "But I'm not involved in any particular projects to encourage women engineers, because I dislike being referred to as a woman engineer. I don't like programs that single out woman engineers as particular achievers just for being women. I think that it should be coincidental."

== Inventions ==
Smith's designs include the screenless hammer mill and the phase-change incubator, and she is also involved with the application of the Malian peanut sheller in Africa. She is also one of the founders of the popular MIT IDEAS Competition. In 2000 Smith won the Lemelson–MIT Student Prize, which honors inventors who are also good role models.

=== Motorized hammermill ===
Smith invented a motorized hammermill that converts grain into flour which she successfully tested in Senegal. The problem with other motor-driven mills is that the screen that filters out rocks and coins could not be made locally and it could take several months to get a new screen. Smith's mill sifted out finished flour aerodynamically using a simpler design that could be manufactured locally by village blacksmiths. "It's nice when looking at things differently is a good thing, and not something where you get zero credit on a problem", Smith said. Smith planned to use some of the prize money from the $30,000 Lemelson-MIT Student Prize to produce and distribute the mills.

=== Phase change incubator ===
Smith worked on an incubator that requires no electricity. The device was originally designed to diagnose sexually transmitted diseases. The phase change incubator won the 1999 B.F. Goodrich Collegiate Inventor's Award for $20,000. Smith planned to start a company around the incubator. "I'm not a person who likes money, so whether it makes a profit is neither here nor there", Smith said. "I didn't want to be in the position of closing down the product because it wasn't making money. That's not the point of the product."

=== Corn sheller ===
With other members of D-Lab and community partners, Smith has developed a small, easy-to-make corn sheller "for removing the dried kernels from an ear of corn. The corn sheller can be either cast in aluminum or made from a sheet of metal." More information on the corn sheller including instructions on how to make it is available under a Creative Commons License at the D-Lab Resources page.

== IDEAS competition ==
Smith co-founded the MIT IDEAS Competition where teams of student engineers design projects to make life easier in the developing world. "Some of the IDEAS competition winners have been very successful", says Smith. "The compound water filter, which removes arsenic and pathogens, is now deployed quite extensively in Nepal. The Kinkajou microfilm projector, used in nighttime literacy classes, is being deployed in Mali. We're working to commercialize a system for testing water for potability. It's in the field in several countries, but not on a widespread basis. We're looking towards doing a trial of aerosol vaccines in Pakistan, so that's exciting."

== International Development Design Summit ==
Smith is one of the lead organizers of the International Development Design Summit (IDDS), held annually to study problems in the developing world and create real, workable solutions to them. "I believe very strongly that solutions to problems in the developing world are best created in collaboration with the people who will be using them", Smith said. "By bringing this group of people together, we get an incredibly broad range of backgrounds and experiences."

WorldChanging reported on August 14, 2007 that the results from the first International Development Design Summit had been very positive with end products including an off-grid refrigeration unit tailored for rural areas using an evaporation based cooling method to store perishable food and a low-cost greenhouse from recycled and widely available materials.

More information on projects from IDDS can be found here.

== Rethink Relief Design Workshop ==
Smith was instrumental in creating the Rethink Relief Design Workshop in 2011. Rethink Relief is "dedicated to creating technologies for humanitarian relief that specifically address the gap between short-term relief and long-term sustainable development."

The workshop was co-organized in October 2011 by industrial design faculty at the Delft University of Technology and the D-Lab of MIT. It brought together 26 people to explore the differences in thinking between relief organizations, development organizations, and designers. Groups worked throughout the week to create concepts and prototypes to address challenges in relief work. These addressed clean water availability, re-purposing of aid materials, transportation challenges, and first aid supply logistics.

== Creative Capacity Building ==
Smith and colleagues at D-Lab have been working on a new type of curriculum - Creative Capacity Building or CCB. The purpose of CCB is to place "the expertise in the village instead of at MIT."

The CCB curriculum teaches the design process without expecting strong literacy or other academic training. The goal is for individuals, groups and communities to be able to not only articulate their needs but to design and build solutions.

== Awards ==
- Collegiate Inventors Award, 1999 (for the phase-change incubator)
- First woman to win the Lemelson-MIT Student Prize, in 2000.
- MacArthur Fellowship, 2004–2009.
- Time magazine named Amy Smith one of their Time 100 Most Influential People for 2010 in the Thinkers category
