= Phase-change incubator =

The phase-change incubator is a low-cost, low-maintenance incubator that tests for microorganisms in water supplies. It uses small balls containing a chemical compound that, when heated and then kept insulated, will stay at 37 °C (approx. 99 °F) for 24 hours. This allows cultures to be tested without the need for a laboratory or an expensive portable incubator. Thus it is particularly useful for poor or remote communities. The phase-change incubator was developed in the late 1990s by Amy Smith, when she was a graduate student at MIT. Smith has also started a non-profit organization called A Drop in the Bucket to distribute the incubators and to train people on how to use them to test water quality. Her “Test Water Cheap” system could be used at remote locations to test for bacteria such as E. coli.

Embrace, an organization that from Stanford University, is applying a similar concept to design low-cost incubators for premature and low birth weight babies in developing countries.

== See also ==
- Appropriate technology
