= Eric Michelman =

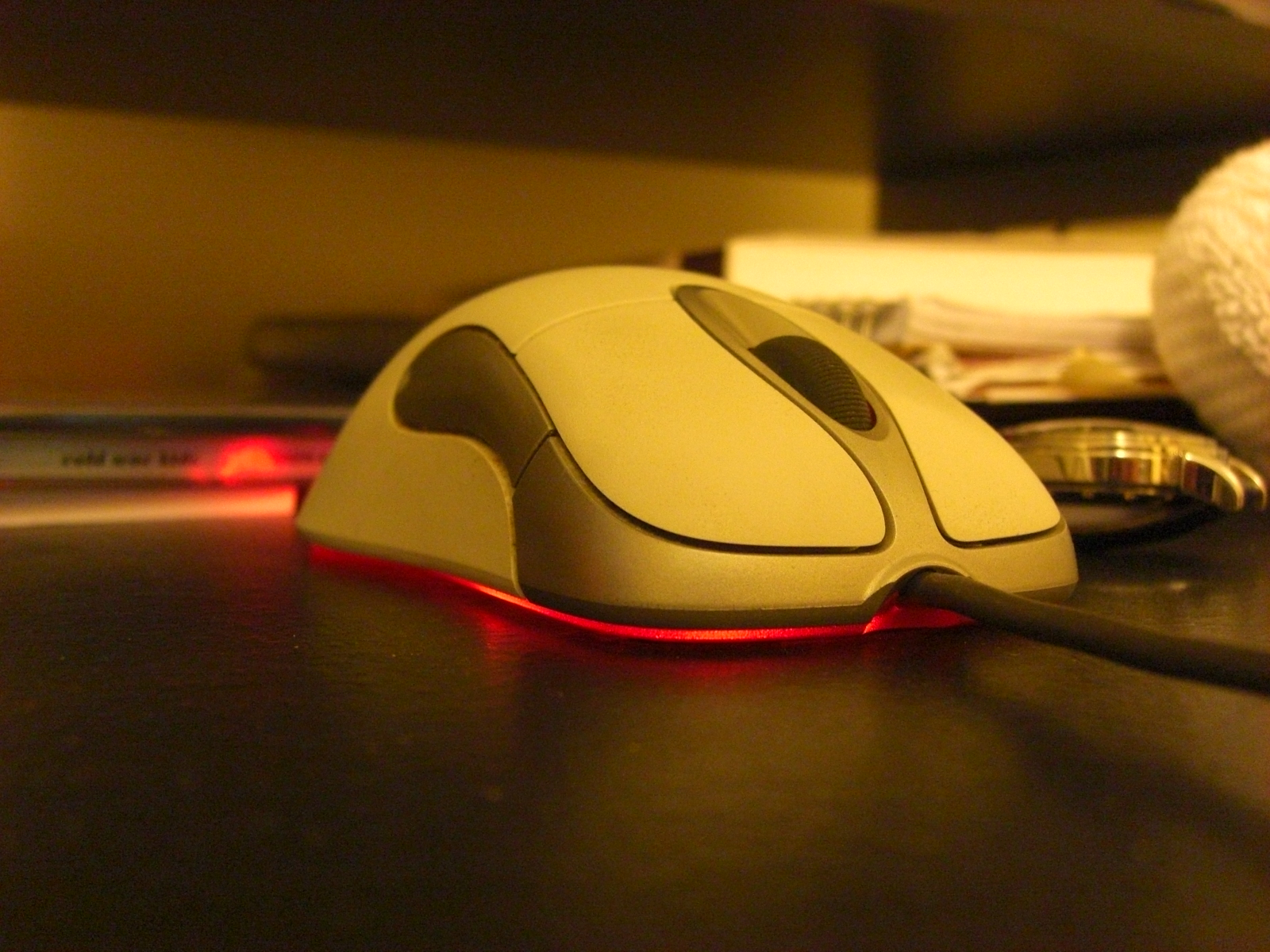
Modern scroll wheel on 5-button mouse. (2008)

Eric Michelman, a graduate from MIT, is credited with inventing the now commonplace computer input device known as the scroll wheel. Scroll wheels are most often located between the left and right-click buttons on modern computer mice.

In 2015 Michelman founded More Than Scientists, a nonprofit outreach program for climate scientists to speak publicly about their personal views on climate change.

== History ==
In 1993, Michelman began work on his project to ease navigation within Excel. His interest in eased navigability stemmed from real-time observation of users entering data in spreadsheets.

“…as I was watching many Excel users do their work, I noticed the difficulty they had moving around large spreadsheets. Finding and jumping to different sections was often difficult. I had the idea that perhaps a richer input device would help.”

Michelman initially looked to add a 'zoom-lever' for the left hand to control while navigating the Microsoft GUI. After experimenting with a joystick assigned to panning (scrolling) as well as zooming, Michelman approached Microsoft's engineers with his idea. In his position as Program Management Lead for the Excel project, he persuaded the hardware engineers to develop added functionality to the current hardware to allow richer input and then evangelized the new functionality to the other Office applications. A debate raged over whether all the Office applications should have the same scrolling or zooming default, with Michelman subsequently conceding to the idea that having them all, including Excel, scroll by default would possess the greatest overall utility. Michelman was charged with organizing the software support for this new function. Being the Program Management Lead for the Excel project, he was well positioned to achieve this, and did.

== Advances in Technology ==
There have been many advances in computing mice since the dawn of the scroll wheel. 1999 brought the advent of a marketable LED technology optical mouse from Agilent. Close following in the same year, Microsoft released its version of an optical mouse, the Intellimouse Explorer.

Michelman's brainchild has since been elaborated on by the likes of Logitech, Apple, and other major computer peripheral manufacturers. In 2007 Logitech combined all of these technologies and more when the company released a 7-button, 2-wheel, fully customizable mousing device aptly named "MX Revolution." This technology is intended to address a user's need when

"The typical computer user has six applications open and switches windows every 50 seconds. In a work day, we rack up 26 feet on the mouse's scroll wheel."

== Other Contributors ==
A jointly developed mouse by Japanese (NTT) and Swiss (ETH) companies may mark the first appearance of a wheel-function on a mouse back in 1985. They developed what was a thumb wheel for their companies, the (original) "Mighty Mouse." This mouse did not catch any traction in the world computing market.

== Additional work by Michelman ==
Michelman has an SB degree from MIT, an MS in Computer Science from UC Berkeley, and an MBA from MIT. Before working at Microsoft, he worked at Apple on the Lisa project and co-founded Analytica with Adam Bosworth, hiring Brad Silverberg as their first employee. Michelman has also been prolific in participating in the production of patents pertaining to different ergonomic and navigability properties of computer input implements. An abbreviated listing is found below.

=== More Than Scientists ===
In 2015 More Than Scientists was founded by Eric Michelman, its director, and Dargan Frierson, associate professor of atmospheric sciences at the University of Washington. It provides an outreach program for climate scientists to speak publicly about their personal views on climate change.

=== Patents ===
- (Scroll wheel) System and method of adjusting display characteristics of a displayable data file using an ergonomic computer input device. US Patent. 2000. Retrieved 2008-12-08
- (Spreadsheet outlining) Method for Hiding and Showing Spreadsheet cells (with Devin Ben-Hur). US Patent. 2000. This was originally filed as Ser. No. 359,678 in 1989 US Patent. 2000. and then later assigned to Microsoft Corp. following its introduction of Excel Version 3 which offered spreadsheet outlining.
- Method and system for peer-to-peer directory services. US Patent. 2004. Retrieved 2008-12-08
- Manipulation of objects in a multi-dimensional representation of an on-line connectivity universe. US Patent. 2005. Retrieved 2008-12-08

=== Works ===
- Security Management in Communications Systems. Sloan School of Management. 1978. Retrieved 2008-12-08
