= Screenless hammer mill =

Hammer mill for grain

The screenless hammer mill, like regular hammer mills, is used to pound grain. However, rather than a screen, it uses air flow to separate small particles from larger ones.

Conventional hammer mills in poor and remote areas, such as many parts of Africa, suffer from the problem that screens break easily, and cannot be easily bought, made or repaired. Thus regular hammer mills break down and fall into disuse. The screenless hammer mill uses air flow to separate small particles from larger ones, rather than a screen, and is thus more reliable.

The screenless hammer mill is claimed to be 25% cheaper and much more energy efficient than regular hammer mills, as well as more reliable.

It was designed by Amy Smith of MIT.

== See also ==
- Appropriate technology
