= Shelter Centre =

Swiss humanitarian organization

- Founded: 2004; 22 years ago in Cambridge, United Kingdom
- Founders: Tom Corsellis and Antonella Vitale
- Type: Non-governmental organization
- Purpose: Shelter, Post-Disaster Reconstruction, Humanitarian aid, training
- Location: Geneva, Switzerland
- Region served: Worldwide
- Method: Biannual Global Forum, Common Humanitarian Library, research, innovation
- Key people: Tom Corsellis, Executive Director; Antonella Vitale, Director (2004-2011)
- Website: www.ShelterCentre.org www.HubAsia.org

Shelter Centre is a Swiss humanitarian NGO that works to support bodies involved in the shelter of populations affected by conflict and natural disaster, stating that is supplies collaboration, consensus, and capacity but does not implement operations directly.

Shelter Centre offers this support through its biannual sector forum, called the Shelter Meeting, maintaining the inter-agency Shelter Library and developing strategic sector guidelines and technical training for field use, always involving a broad consensus within the humanitarian community.

== History ==
Operationally, in 2005 following the Indian Ocean tsunami of 2004, Shelter Centre introduced the Transitional Shelter approach, while the executive director was seconded by DFID to the United Nations High Commissioner for Refugees to lead natural humanitarian shelter coordination. The Transitional Shelter approach was also one of the response options in the 2010 sector response plan for shelter in Haiti, agreed with the Government of Haiti while the Shelter Centre executive director was seconded by DFID to the International Organization for Migration to the lead national shelter coordination. In 2010, in collaboration with the United Nations Office for the Coordination of Humanitarian Affairs and funded by DFID, Shelter Centre led the revision of strategic sector guidelines Shelter After Disaster. After developing technical training with the RedR UK and India, the Inter-Agency Standing Committee, the International federation of Red Cross and Red Crescent Societies and the UNHCR, in 2011 Shelter Centre led the development of CORE Workshops, funded by ECHO and DFID. CORE involves humanitarian agencies worldwide in agreeing and delivering together common humanitarian technical training.

In accordance with its mission, Shelter Centre is an active partner in five of the global humanitarian coordination clusters of the IASC, Camp Coordination and Camp Management (CCCM), Early Recovery, Shelter, Protection and Water and Sanitation Hygiene (WASH).

Hosted initially by the University of Cambridge from its foundation in 2004, Shelter Centre developed from an earlier initiative, ShelterProject.org, which undertook research and development on sector standards, equipment and technical guidance, including Transitional Settlement: Displaced Populations. Tom Corsellis, executive director of Shelter Centre, was a founding member of both initiatives.

In 2006, after having attained five years programme funding from DFID, Shelter Centre activities were hosted under a two-year agreement by IFRC; Shelter Centre subsequently transitioned from being a UK NGO to a Swiss NGO in summer of 2008, relocating to Geneva. Its offices are currently in part under an agreement involving the Geneva Welcome Centre (CAGI), founded by the Swiss Confederation and the Canton of Geneva.
