= Timeline of United States inventions (1946–1991) =

A timeline of United States inventions (1946–1991) encompasses the innovative advancements of the United States within a historical context, dating from the end of World War II to the end of the Cold War, which have been achieved by inventors who are either native-born or naturalized citizens of the United States. Patent protection secures a person's right to their first-to-invent claim of the original invention in question, highlighted in Article I, Section 8, Clause 8 of the United States Constitution which gives the following enumerated power to the United States Congress:

To promote the Progress of Science and useful Arts, by securing for limited Times to Authors and Inventors the exclusive Right to their respective Writings and Discoveries.

In 1641, the first patent in North America was issued to Samuel Winslow by the General Court of Massachusetts for a new method of making salt. On April 10, 1790, President George Washington signed the Patent Act of 1790 (1 Stat. 109) into law which proclaimed that patents were to be authorized for "any useful art, manufacture, engine, machine, or device, or any improvement therein not before known or used." On July 31, 1790, Samuel Hopkins of Pittsford, Vermont became the first person in the United States to file and to be granted a patent for an improved method of "Making Pot and Pearl Ashes." The Patent Act of 1836 (Ch. 357, 5 Stat. 117) further clarified United States patent law to the extent of establishing a patent office where patent applications are filed, processed, and granted, contingent upon the language and scope of the claimant's invention, for a patent term of 14 years with an extension of up to an additional 7 years. However, the Uruguay Round Agreements Act of 1994 (URAA) changed the patent term in the United States to a total of 20 years, effective for patent applications filed on or after June 8, 1995, thus bringing United States patent law further into conformity with international patent law. The modern-day provisions of the law applied to inventions are laid out in Title 35 of the United States Code (Ch. 950, sec. 1, 66 Stat. 792).

From 1836 to 2011, the United States Patent and Trademark Office (USPTO) has granted a total of 7,861,317 patents relating to several well-known inventions appearing throughout the timeline below.

== Post-war and the late Forties (1946–1949) ==
1946 Spoonplug

- A spoonplug is a form of fishing lure. The spoonplug was invented by Elwood L. "Buck" Perry, then a physics and math teacher in Hickory, North Carolina. Elwood Perry combined science with a logical approach to fishing to create a "total fishing system." He is credited as being the father of structure fishing and was later inducted into the National Freshwater Fishing Hall of Fame.

1946 Cancer chemotherapy

- Cancer chemotherapy can be traced directly to the discovery of nitrogen mustard, a chemical warfare agent, as an effective treatment for cancer. Two pharmacologists, Louis S. Goodman and Alfred Gilman were recruited by the United States Department of Defense to investigate potential therapeutic applications of chemical warfare agents. Autopsy observations of people exposed to mustard gas had revealed profound lymphoid and myeloid suppression. Goodman and Gilman reasoned that this agent could be used to treat lymphoma, since lymphoma is a tumor of lymphoid cells. They set up an animal model and established lymphomas in mice and demonstrated they could treat them with mustard agents. In collaboration with a thoracic surgeon, Gustav Linskog, they injected a related agent, mustine into a patient with non-Hodgkin's lymphoma. They observed a dramatic reduction in the patient's tumor masses. Although this effect lasted only a few weeks, this was the first step to the realization that cancer could be treated by pharmacological agents.

1946 DEET

- N,N-Diethyl-meta-toluamide, abbreviated DEET, is the most common active ingredient in insect repellents. It is intended to be applied to the skin or to clothing, and is primarily used to repel mosquitos. DEET was invented by the United States Army in 1946 following its experience of jungle warfare during World War II.

1946 Proton therapy

- Proton therapy utilizes a beam of protons to irradiate diseased tissue, most often in the treatment of cancer. The first suggestion that energetic protons could be an effective treatment method was made by Robert R. Wilson in a paper published in 1946 while he was involved in the design of the Harvard Cyclotron Laboratory (HCL). The first treatments were performed at particle accelerators built for physics research, notably Berkeley Radiation Laboratory in 1954 and at Uppsala in Sweden in 1957.

1946 Cloud seeding

- Cloud seeding, a form of weather modification, is the attempt to change the amount or type of precipitation that falls from clouds, by dispersing substances into the air that serve as cloud condensation or ice nuclei, which alter the microphysical processes within the cloud. The usual intent is to increase precipitation but hail and fog suppression are also widely practiced in airports. The method's use has ranged from increasing precipitation in areas experiencing drought to removing radioactive particles from clouds. Cloud seeding was invented by Vincent Schaefer in 1946.

1947 Transistor

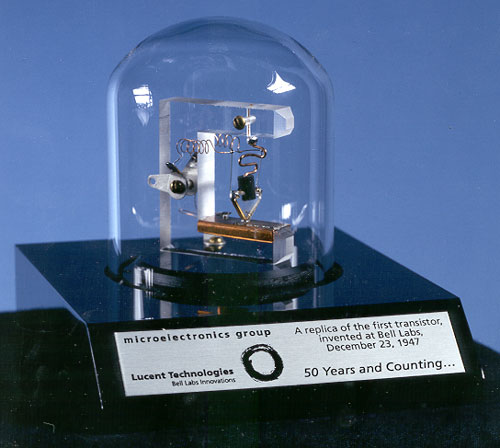
A replica of the first working transistor.

In electronics, a transistor is a semiconductor device commonly used to amplify or switch electronic signals. Because the controlled output power can be much larger than the controlling input power, the transistor provides amplification of a signal. The transistor is the fundamental building block of all modern electronic devices, and is used in radio, telephone, computer, and other electronic systems. From November 17, 1947, to December 23, 1947, John Bardeen and Walter Brattain at AT&T Bell Labs, underwent experimentations and finally observed that when two gold point contacts were applied to a crystal of germanium, a signal was produced whereby the output power was larger than the input. The American physicist and 1956 Nobel Prize winner, William Shockley, saw the potential in this and worked over the next few months greatly expanding the knowledge of semiconductors in order to construct the first point-contact transistor. Shockley is considered by many to be the "father" of the transistor. Hence, in recognition of his work, the transistor is widely, yet not universally acknowledged as the most important invention of the entire 20th century since it forms today's building blocks of processors found and used in almost every modern computing and electronics device.

1947 Defibrillator

Defibrillation is the definitive treatment for the life-threatening cardiac arrhythmias, ventricular fibrillation and ventricular tachycardia. Defibrillation consists of delivering a therapeutic dose of electrical energy to the affected heart. Dr. Claude Beck invented the defibrillator in 1947.

1947 Acrylic paint

Acrylic paint is fast-drying paint containing pigment suspended in an acrylic polymer emulsion. The first acrylic paint was invented by Leonard Bocour and Sam Golden in 1947 under the brand Magna paint.

1947 Correction fluid

- Correction fluid is an opaque, white fluid applied to paper to mask errors in text. It was very important when material was typed with a typewriter, but has become less so since the advent of the word processor. Correction fluid was invented by Bette Nesmith Graham in 1951 and originally called by the brand name Mistake Out.

1947 Mobile phone

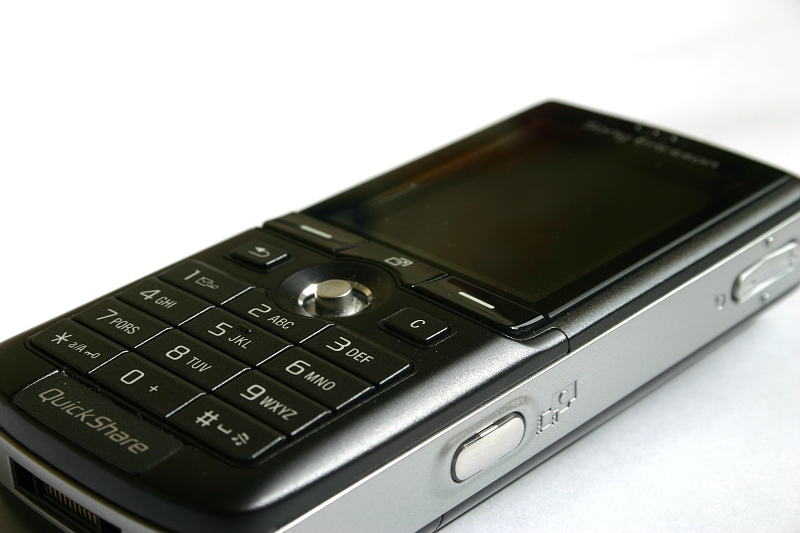
The advent of wireless telephone communications

A mobile phone, or cell phone, is a long-range, electronic device used for mobile voice or data communication over a network of specialized base stations known as cell sites. Early mobile FM radio telephones were in use for many years, but since the number of radio frequencies were very limited in any area, the number of phone calls were also very limited. To solve this problem, there could be many small areas called cells which share the same frequencies. When users moved from one area to another while calling, the call would have to be switched over automatically without losing the call. In this system, a small number of radio frequencies could accommodate a huge number of calls. The first mobile telephone call was made from a car in St. Louis, Missouri on June 17, 1946, but the system was impractical from what is considered a portable handset today. The equipment weighed 80 lbs, and the AT&T service, basically a massive party line, cost $30 per month plus 30 to 40 cents per local call. The basic network of hexagonal cells were devised by Douglas H. Ring and W. Rae Young at AT&T Bell Labs in 1947. Known as the "father of the cell phone," Martin Cooper invented the first handheld cellular/mobile phone in 1973.

1947 Instant camera

The instant camera is a type of camera with self-developing film. In 1947, Edwin H. Land invented a new camera that produced photographic images in 60 seconds. A colored photograph model would follow in the 1960s and eventually receive more than 500 patents for Land's innovations in light and plastic technologies.

1947 Supersonic aircraft

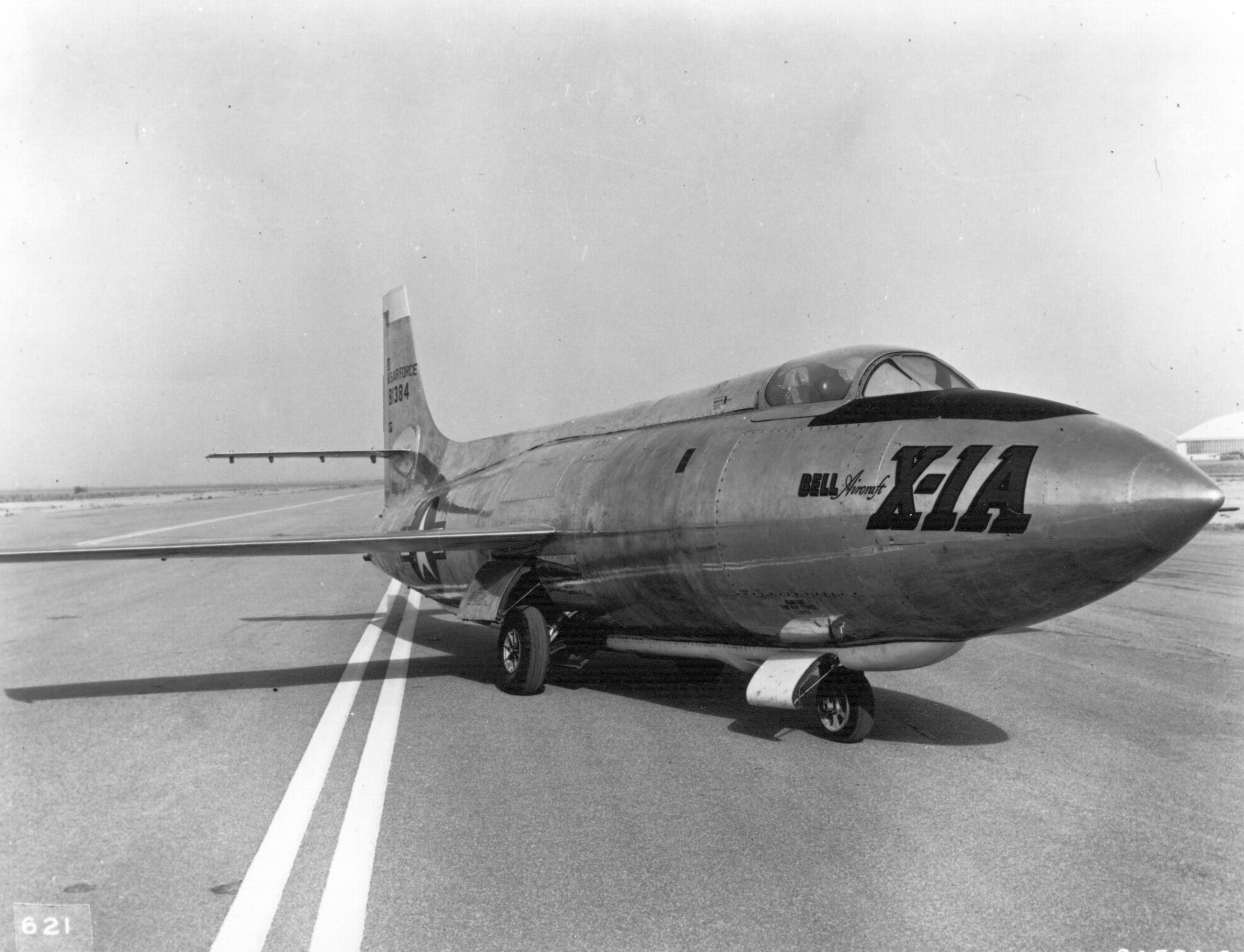
The Bell X-1

In aerodynamics, the sound barrier usually refers to the point at which an aircraft moves from transonic to supersonic speed. On October 14, 1947, just under a month after the United States Air Force had been created as a separate service, tests culminated in the first manned supersonic flight where the sound barrier was broken, piloted by Air Force Captain Chuck Yeager in the Bell X-1.

1948 Hair spray

Hair spray is a beauty aqueous solution that is used to keep hair stiff or in a certain style. Weaker than hair gel, hair wax, or glue, it is sprayed to hold styles for a long period. Using a pump or aerosol spray nozzle, it sprays evenly over the hair. Hair spray was first invented and manufactured in 1948 by Chase Products Company, based in Broadview, Illinois.

1948 Windsurfing

Windsurfing in Maui

Windsurfing, or sailboarding, is a surface water sport using a windsurf board, also commonly called a sailboard, usually two to five meters long and powered by wind pushing a sail. In 1948, 20 year old Newman Darby first conceived of using a handheld sail and rig mounted on a universal joint, to control a small catamaran. Darby did not file for a patent for his design, however, he is regonized as the inventor of the first sailboard. However, what is clear from the historical record is that windsurfing, as it is known today, owes much if not all to the promotion and marketing activities of Hoyle and Diana Schweitzer. In 1968, they founded the company Windsurfing International in Southern California to manufacture, promote and license a windsurfer design. Together with Jim Drake, an aerospace engineer at the RAND Corporation, they were the holders of the very first windsurfing patent ever, which was granted by the United States Patent and Trademark Office in 1970, after being filed in 1968.

1948 Cat litter

Cat litter is one of any of a number of materials used in litter boxes to absorb moisture from cat feces and urine, which reduces foul odors such as ammonia and renders them more tolerable within the home. The first commercially available cat litter was Kitty Litter, available in 1948 and invented by Ed Lowe.

1948 Video game

- A video game is an electronic game that involves interaction with a user interface to generate visual feedback on a video device. In 1948, ten years before William Higinbotham's Tennis for Two was developed, Thomas T. Goldsmith Jr. and Estle R. Mann co-patented the “Cathode-Ray Tube Amusement Device,” making it the earliest documented video game. Primitive by modern standards in video gaming, the amusement device, however, required players to overlay pictures or illustrations of targets such as airplanes in front of the screen, dovetailing the game's action.

1948 Cable television

- Cable television provides television to consumers via radio frequency signals transmitted to televisions through fixed optical fibers or coaxial cables as opposed to the over-the-air method used in traditional television broadcasting. First known as Community Antenna Television or CATV, cable television was born in the mountains of Pennsylvania in 1948 by John Walson and Margaret Walson.

1948 Flying disc

- Flying discs are disc-shaped objects thrown and caught for recreation, which are generally plastic and roughly 20 to 25 centimeters (8–10 inches) in diameter, with a lip. The shape of the disc, an airfoil in cross-section, allows it to fly by generating lift as it moves through the air while rotating. First known as the "Whirlo-Way", the flying disc was invented in 1949 by Walter Frederick Morrison who combined his fascination with invention and his interest in flight. Carved from a solid block of a plastic compound known as "Tenite," Morrison sold his flying disc invention to WHAM–O, which introduced it in 1957 as the "Pluto Platter." In 1958, WHAM–O modified the "Pluto Platter" and introduced the "FRISBIE" flying disc to the world. It became an instant sensation.

1949 Radiocarbon dating

- Radiocarbon dating is a dating method that uses the naturally occurring radioisotope carbon-14 (14C) to determine the age of carbonaceous materials up to about 60,000 years. In 1949, Willard F. Libby invented the procedure for carbon-14 dating.

1949 Airsickness bag

- An airsickness bag, also known as a barf bag, airsick bag, sick bag, or motion sickness bag, is a small bag commonly provided to passengers onboard airplanes and boats to collect and contain vomit in the event of motion sickness. The airsickness bag was invented by Gilmore Schjeldahl in 1949 for Northwest Orient Airlines.

1949 Ice resurfacer

- An ice resurfacer is a truck-like vehicle used to clean and smooth the surface of an ice rink. Frank J. Zamboni of Paramount, California invented the first ice resurfacer, which he called a Zamboni, in 1949.

1949 Modacrylic

- A modacrylic is a synthetic copolymer. They are soft, strong, resilient, and dimensionally stable. Commercial production of modacrylic fiber began in 1949 by Union Carbide Corporation in the United States.

1949 Holter monitor

- A Holter monitor is a portable device for continuously monitoring the electrical activity of the heart for 24 hours or more. The holter monitor was invented by Norman Holter in 1949.

1949 Atomic clock

- An atomic clock uses an atomic resonance frequency standard as its timekeeping element. The first atomic clock was an ammonia maser device built in 1949 at the United States National Bureau of Standards.

1949 Compiler

- A compiler is a computer program or set of programs that transforms source code written in a computerized source language into another computer language often having a binary form known as an object code. The most common reason for wanting to transform source code is to create an executable program. The first compiler written for the A-0 programming language is attributed to its inventor, Grace Hopper in 1949.

1949 Centrifugal clutch

- A centrifugal clutch is a clutch that uses centrifugal force to connect two concentric shafts, with the driving shaft nested inside the driven shaft. The input of the clutch is connected to the engine crankshaft while the output may drive a shaft, chain, or belt. As engine RPM increases, weighted arms in the clutch swing outward and force the clutch to engage. The centrifugal clutch was invented in 1949 by Thomas Fogarty when he was 15 years old.

== The Fifties (1950–1959) ==
1950 Artificial snowmaking

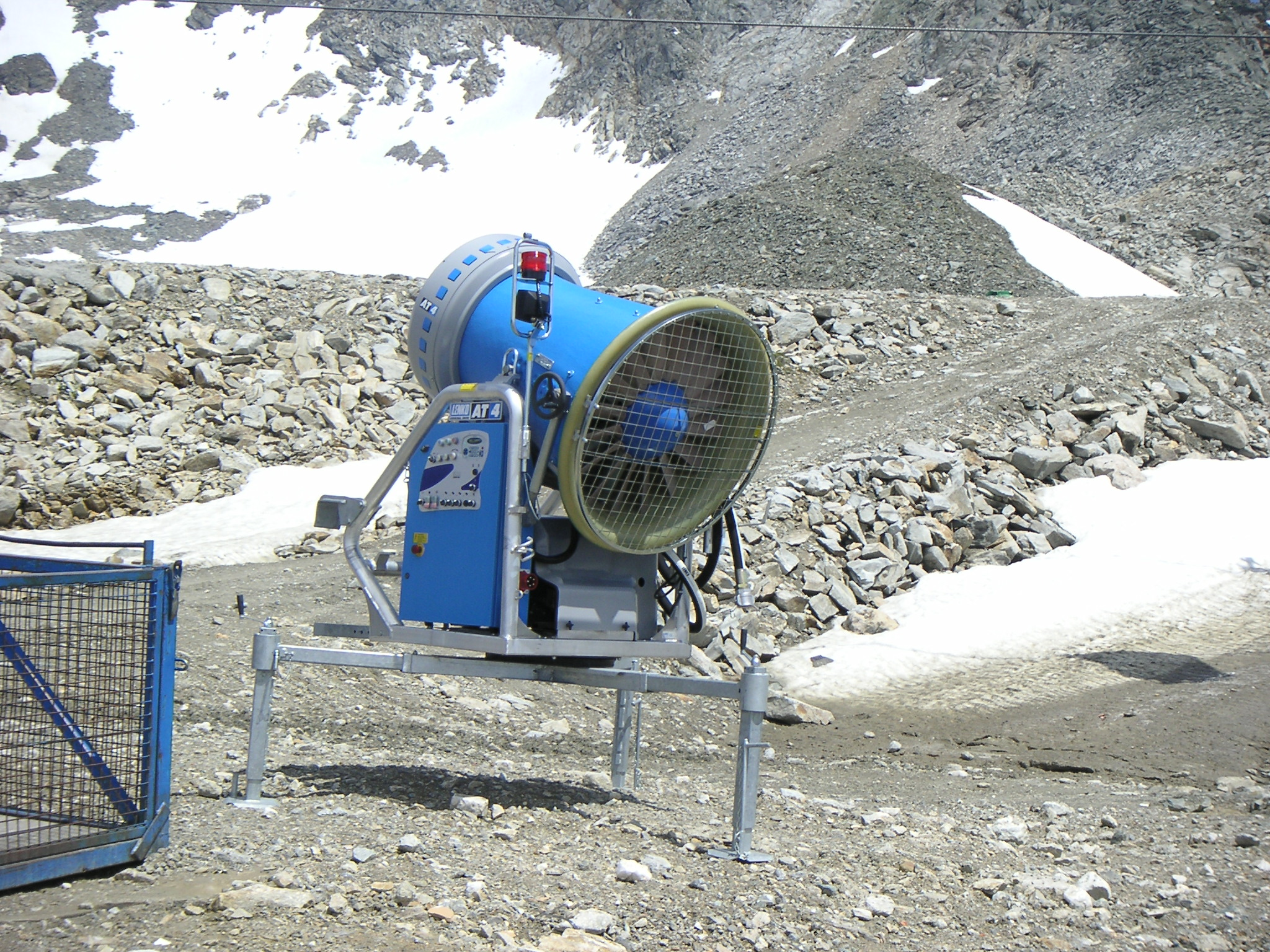
A rear view of a snow cannon with its fan showing

Snowmaking is the artificial production of snow by forcing water and pressurized air through a "snow gun" or "snow cannon", on ski slopes. Snowmaking is mainly used at ski resorts to supplement natural snow. This allows ski resorts to improve the reliability of their snow cover and to extend their ski seasons. The costly production of snowmaking requires low temperatures. The threshold temperature for snowmaking decreases as humidity decreases. Machine-made snow was first co-invented by three engineers—Art Hunt, Dave Richey and Wayne Pierce of Milford, Connecticut on March 14, 1950. Their patented invention of the first "snow cannon" used a garden hose, a 10-horsepower compressor, and a spray-gun nozzle, which produced about 20 inches of snow.

1950 Credit card

A credit card is part of a system of payments named after the small plastic card issued to users of the system. The issuer of the card grants a line of credit to the consumer from which the user can borrow money for payment to a merchant or as a cash advance to the user. The concept of paying different merchants using the same card was invented in 1950 by Ralph Schneider and Frank X. McNamara, founders of Diners Club, to consolidate multiple cards.

1950 Leaf blower

A leaf blower is a gardening tool that propels air out of a nozzle to move yard debris such as leaves. Leaf blowers are usually powered by two-stroke engine or an electric motor, but four-stroke engines were recently introduced to partially address air pollution concerns. Leaf blowers are typically self contained handheld units, or backpack mounted units with a handheld wand. The leaf blower was invented by Dom Quinto in 1950.

1950 Disposable diaper

- A diaper or nappy is an absorbent garment for incontinent people. The disposable diaper was invented in 1950 by Marion Donovan. Her first leak-proof diaper was a plastic-lined cloth diaper. Donovan then developed a disposable diaper. She was unsuccessful at selling her invention to established manufacturers, so she started her own company.

1950 Sengstaken-Blakemore tube

- A Sengstaken-Blakemore tube is an oro or nasogastric tube used occasionally in the management of upper gastrointestinal hemorrhage due to bleeding from esophageal varices which are distended veins in the esophageal wall, usually as a result of cirrhosis. It consists of a gastric balloon, an esophageal balloon, and a gastric suction port. The Sengstaken-Blakemore tube was invented by Dr. Robert W. Sengstaken and Dr. Arthur H. Blakemore in 1950.

1951 Cooler

- A cool box, cooler, portable ice chest, chilly bin, or esky most commonly is an insulated box used to keep perishable food or beverages cool. Ice cubes, which are very cold, are most commonly placed in it to make the things inside stay cool. Ice packs are sometimes used, as they either contain the melting water inside, or have a gel sealed inside that also stays cold longer than plain water. The cooler was invented in 1951 by Richard C. Laramy of Joliet, Illinois. Laramy filed a patent for the cooler on February 24, 1951, and was issued U.S. patent #2,663,157 on December 22, 1953.

1951 Wetsuit

- A wetsuit is a garment, usually made of foamed neoprene, which is worn by divers, windsurfers, canoeists, and others engaged in water sports, providing thermal insulation, abrasion resistance and buoyancy. The insulation properties depend on bubbles of gas enclosed within the material, which reduce its ability to conduct heat. The bubbles also give the wetsuit a low density, providing buoyancy in water. The wetsuit was invented in 1951 by the University of California at Berkeley physicist named Hugh Bradner.

1951 Golf cart

- A golf cart or golf buggy is a small vehicle designed originally to carry two golfers and their golf clubs around a golf course. The golf cart was invented by Merle Williams of Long Beach, California in 1951.

1952 Polio vaccine

- Vaccination works by priming the immune system with an 'immunogen'. Stimulating immune response, via use of an infectious agent, is known as immunization. The development of immunity to polio efficiently blocks person-to-person transmission of wild poliovirus, thereby protecting both individual vaccine recipients and the wider community. In 1952, Dr. Jonas Salk announced his trial vaccine for Polio, or poliomyelitis. Salk's vaccine was composed of "killed" polio virus, which retained the ability to immunize without the risk of infecting the patient. In 1954, Salk published his findings in the Journal of the American Medical Association, and nationwide testing was carried out. In 1955, Salk's polio vaccine was made public.

1952 Barcode

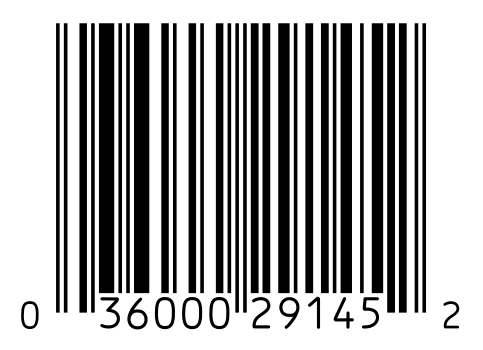
A UPC-A barcode symbol

A barcode is an optical machine-readable representation of data, which shows certain data on certain products. Originally, barcodes represented data in the widths (lines) and the spacings of parallel lines, and may be referred to as linear or 1 dimensional barcodes or symbologies. They also come in patterns of squares, dots, hexagons and other geometric patterns within images termed 2 dimensional matrix codes or symbologies. Norman Joseph Woodland is best known for inventing the barcode for which he received a patent in October 1952.

1952 Artificial heart

An artificial heart is implanted into the body to replace the biological heart. On July 3, 1952, 41-year-old Henry Opitek suffering from shortness of breath made medical history at Harper University Hospital at Wayne State University in Michigan. The Dodrill-GMR heart machine, considered to be the first operational mechanical heart was successfully inserted by Dr. Forest Dewey Dodrill into Henry Opitek while performing heart surgery. In 1981, Robert Jarvik implanted the world's first permanent artificial heart, the Jarvik 7, into Dr. Barney Clark. The heart, powered by an external compressor, kept Clark alive for 112 days. The Jarvik heart was not banned for permanent use. Since 1982, more than 350 people have received the Jarvik heart as a bridge to transplantation.

1953 Heart-lung machine

- Dr. John Heysham Gibbon performed the first successful cardiopulmonary bypass surgery in which the blood was artificially circulated and oxygenated by using his invention, a pump known as the heart-lung machine. This new medical technology, which allowed the surgeon to operate on a dry and motionless heart by maintaining the circulation of blood and the oxygen content of the body, greatly increased surgical treatment options for heart defects and disease.

1953 Marker pen

- A marker pen, marking pen, felt-tip pen, or marker, is a pen which has its own colored ink-source, and usually a tip made of a porous material, such as felt or nylon. Sidney Rosenthal, from Richmond Hill, New York, is credited with inventing the marker in 1953.

1953 Apgar scale

- The Apgar scale is used to determine the physical status of an infant at birth. The Apgar scale is administered to a newborn at one minute after birth and five minutes after birth. It scores the baby's heart rate, respiration, muscle tone, reflex response, and color. This test quickly alerts medical personnel that the newborn needs assistance. This simple, easy-to-perform test was invented in 1953 by Dr. Virginia Apgar, a professor of anesthesia at the New York Columbia-Presbyterian Medical Center.

1953 Wiffle ball

- Wiffleball is a variation of the sport of baseball designed for indoor or outdoor play in confined areas. The game is played using a perforated, light-weight, rubbery plastic ball and a long, plastic and typically a yellow bat. The Wiffle ball was invented by David N. Mullany of Fairfield, Connecticut in 1953 when he designed a ball that curved easily for his 12-year-old son. It was named when his son and his friends would refer to a strikeout as a "whiff".

1953 MASER

- A maser is produces coherent electromagnetic waves through amplification due to stimulated emission. Historically the term came from the acronym "Microwave Amplification by Stimulated Emission of Radiation". Charles H. Townes, J. P. Gordon, and H. J. Zeiger built the first maser at Columbia University in 1953.

1953 Carbonless copy paper

- Carbonless copy paper is an alternative to carbon paper, used to make a copy of an original, handwritten document without the use of any electronics. Carbonless copy paper was invented by chemists Lowell Schleicher and Barry Green, working for the NCR Corporation, as a biodegradable, stain-free alternative to carbon paper.

1953 Crossed-field amplifier

- A crossed-field amplifier (CFA) is a specialized vacuum tube frequently used as a microwave amplifier in very-high-power transmitters. A CFA has lower gain and bandwidth than other microwave amplifier tubes, but it is more efficient and capable of much higher output power. William C. Brown is considered to have invented the first crossed-field amplifier in 1953 which he called an Amplitron.

1954 TV dinner

- A TV dinner is a prepackaged, frozen or chilled meal generally in an individual package. It requires little preparation, oven baked or microwaveable, and contains all the elements for a single-serving meal in a tray with compartments for the food. Carl A. Swanson of C.A. Swanson & Sons is generally credited for inventing the TV dinner. Retired Swanson executive Gerry Thomas said he conceived the idea after the company found itself with a huge surplus of frozen turkeys because of poor Thanksgiving sales.

1954 Acoustic suspension loudspeaker

- The acoustic suspension woofer is a type of loudspeaker that reduces bass distortion caused by non-linear, stiff mechanical suspensions in conventional loudspeakers. The acoustic suspension loudspeaker was invented in 1954 by Edgar Villchur, and brought to commercial production by Villchur and Henry Kloss with the founding of Acoustic Research in Cambridge Massachusetts.

1954 Automatic sliding doors

- Automatic doors are powered open and closed either by power, spring, or by a sensor. Automatic sliding doors are commonly found at entrance and exits of supermarkets, department stores, and airport terminals. In 1954, Dee Horton and Lew Hewitt invented the automatic sliding door.

1954 Cardiopulmonary resuscitation

- Cardiopulmonary resuscitation is an important life saving first aid skill, practiced throughout the world. It is the only known effective method of keeping someone who has suffered cardiac arrest alive long enough for definitive treatment to be delivered. In 1954, James Elam was the first to demonstrate experimentally that cardiopulmonary resuscitation (CPR) was a sound technique, and together with Dr. Peter Safar he demonstrated its superiority to previous methods.

1954 Synthetic diamond

- Synthetic diamonds are diamonds produced in a technological process as opposed to natural diamonds, which are created in geological processes. Synthetic diamonds are also widely known as HPHT diamonds or CVD diamonds, HPHT and CVD being the production methods, high-pressure high-temperature synthesis and chemical vapor deposition, respectively. Although the concept of producing high quality artificial diamonds is an old one, the reproductable synthesis of diamonds is not. In 1954, Howard Tracy Hall at the GE Research Laboratory invented a belt press in the shape of a doughnut, which confined the sample chamber and two curved, tapered pistons to apply pressure on the chamber in order to produce the first commercially successful and reproducible synthesis of a diamond.

1954 Radar gun

- A radar gun or speed gun is a small Doppler radar used to detect the speed of objects. It relies on the Doppler Effect applied to a radar beam to measure the speed of objects at which it is pointed. Radar guns may be hand-held or vehicle-mounted. Bryce K. Brown invented the radar gun in March 1954.

1955 Crosby-Kugler capsule

- A Crosby-Kugler capsule is a device used for obtaining biopsies of small bowel mucosa, necessary for the diagnosis of various small bowel diseases. It was invented by Dr. William Holmes Crosby, Jr. in 1955.

1955 Nuclear submarine

- The USS Nautilus (SNN 571), the world's first nuclear submarine, revolutionized naval warfare. Conventional submarines need two engines: a diesel engine to travel on the surface and an electric engine to travel submerged, where oxygen for a diesel engine is not available. By relying on nuclear capability, the USS Nautilus could travel uninterrupted for thousands of miles below the surface with a single fuel charge. Beginning in 1951, Admiral Hyman Rickover can be credited for the design of the world's first nuclear submarine who led and oversaw a group of scientists and engineers at the Naval Reactors Branch of the Atomic Energy Commission. After sea trials were conducted and testing was completed, the USS Nautilus became fully operational in January 1955.

1955 Hard disk drive

- A hard disk drive, or hard drive, hard disk, or fixed disk drive, is a non-volatile storage device which stores digitally encoded data on rapidly rotating platters with magnetic surfaces. The hard disk drive was invented by Reynold Johnson and commercially introduced in 1956 with the IBM 305 RAMAC computer.

1956 Kart racing

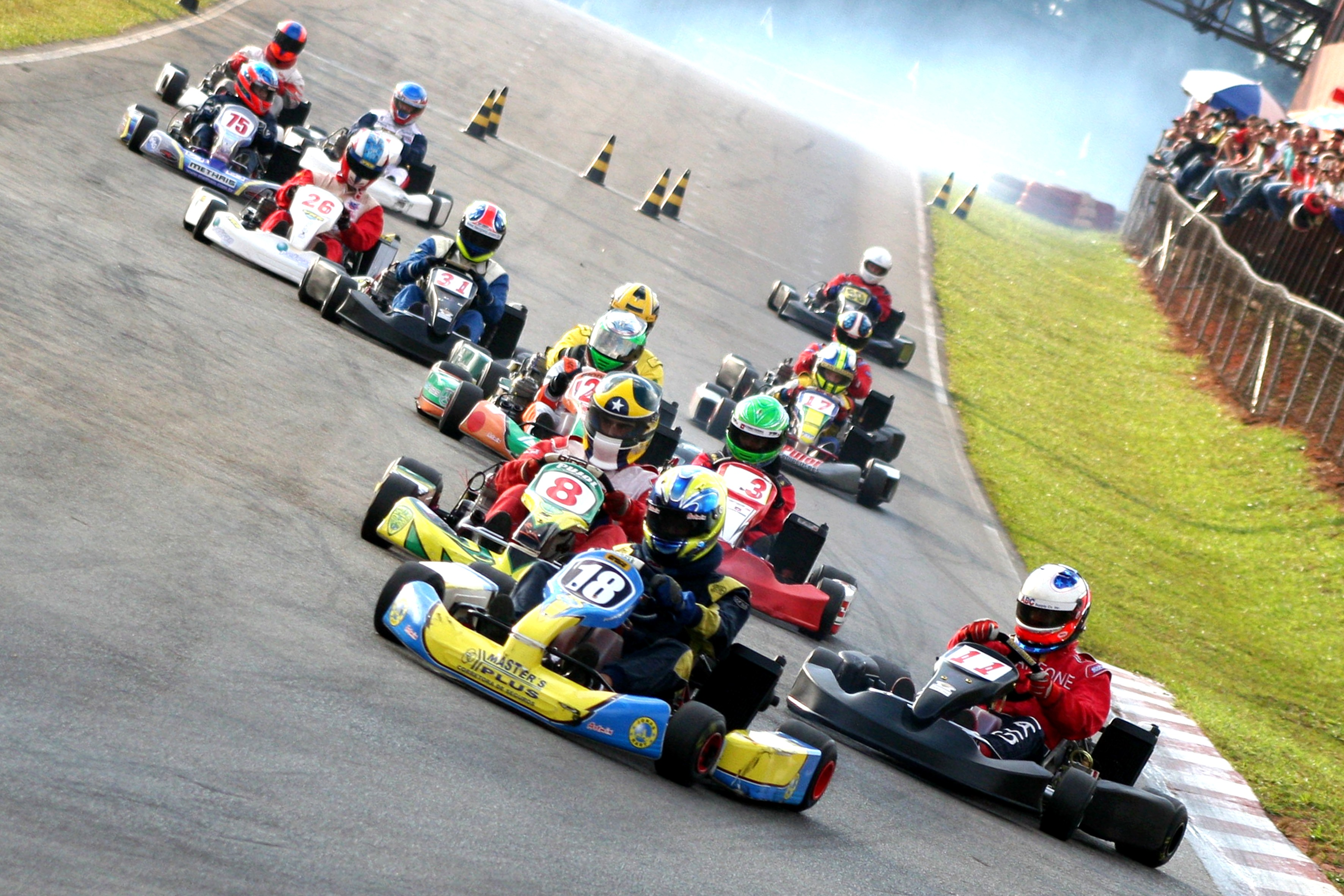
Go-karts on a speedway

Kart racing or karting is a variant of an open-wheel motor sport with simple, small four-wheeled vehicles called karts, go-karts, or gearbox karts depending on the design. Karts vary widely in speed and some can reach speeds exceeding 160 mph, while go-karts intended for the general public in amusement parks may be limited to speeds of no more than 15 mph. In the summer of 1956, hot rod veteran Art Ingels built the first go-kart out of old car frame tubing, welding beads, and a lawnmower motor, not realizing that he had invented a new sport and form of auto racing.

1956 Bone marrow transplantation

Stem cell transplantation was pioneered using bone-marrow-derived stem cells by a team at the Fred Hutchinson Cancer Research Center from the 1950s through the 1970s. The first successful bone marrow transplantation was for a cancer patient and was performed by E. Donnall Thomas in 1956.

1956 Industrial robot

An industrial robot is an automatically controlled, re-programmable, multipurpose manipulator programmable in three or more axes. The first to invent an industrial robot was George Devol and Joseph F. Engelberger.

1956 Fortran

- Fortran is a general-purpose, procedural, and imperative programming language that is especially suited to numeric computation and scientific computing. Fortran came to dominate this area of programming early on and has been in continual use for over half a century in computationally intensive areas such as numerical weather prediction, finite element analysis, computational fluid dynamics (CFD), computational physics, and computational chemistry. It is one of the most popular languages in the area of High-performance computing and programs to benchmark and rank the world's fastest supercomputers are written in Fortran. In 1956, John Backus and a team of researchers at IBM invented the Fortran programming language for the IBM 704 mainframe computer.

1956 Videotape

- Videotape is a means of recording images and sound onto magnetic tape as opposed to movie film. The first practical professional videotape machines were the Quadruplex machines introduced by Ampex on April 14, 1956. Invented by Charles Ginsburg and Ray Dolby, Quad employed a transverse four-head system on a two-inch (5.08 cm) tape, and linear heads for the soundtrack.

1956 Particle storage ring

- A storage ring is a type of circular particle accelerator in which a continuous or pulsed particle beam may be kept circulating for a long period of time, up to many hours. Gerard K. O'Neill invented the first particle storage ring in 1956.

1957 Wireless microphone

- A wireless microphone, also known as a lavalier microphone, is a small dynamic microphone used for television, theatre, and public speaking applications, in order to allow hands-free operation. They are most commonly provided with small clips for attaching to collars, ties, or other clothing. The cord may be hidden by clothes and either run to a radio frequency transmitter in a pocket or clipped to a belt for mobile work, or directly to the mixer for stationary applications. The wireless microphone was invented in 1957 and patented in 1964 by the American electronics engineer Raymond A. Litke.

1957 Laser

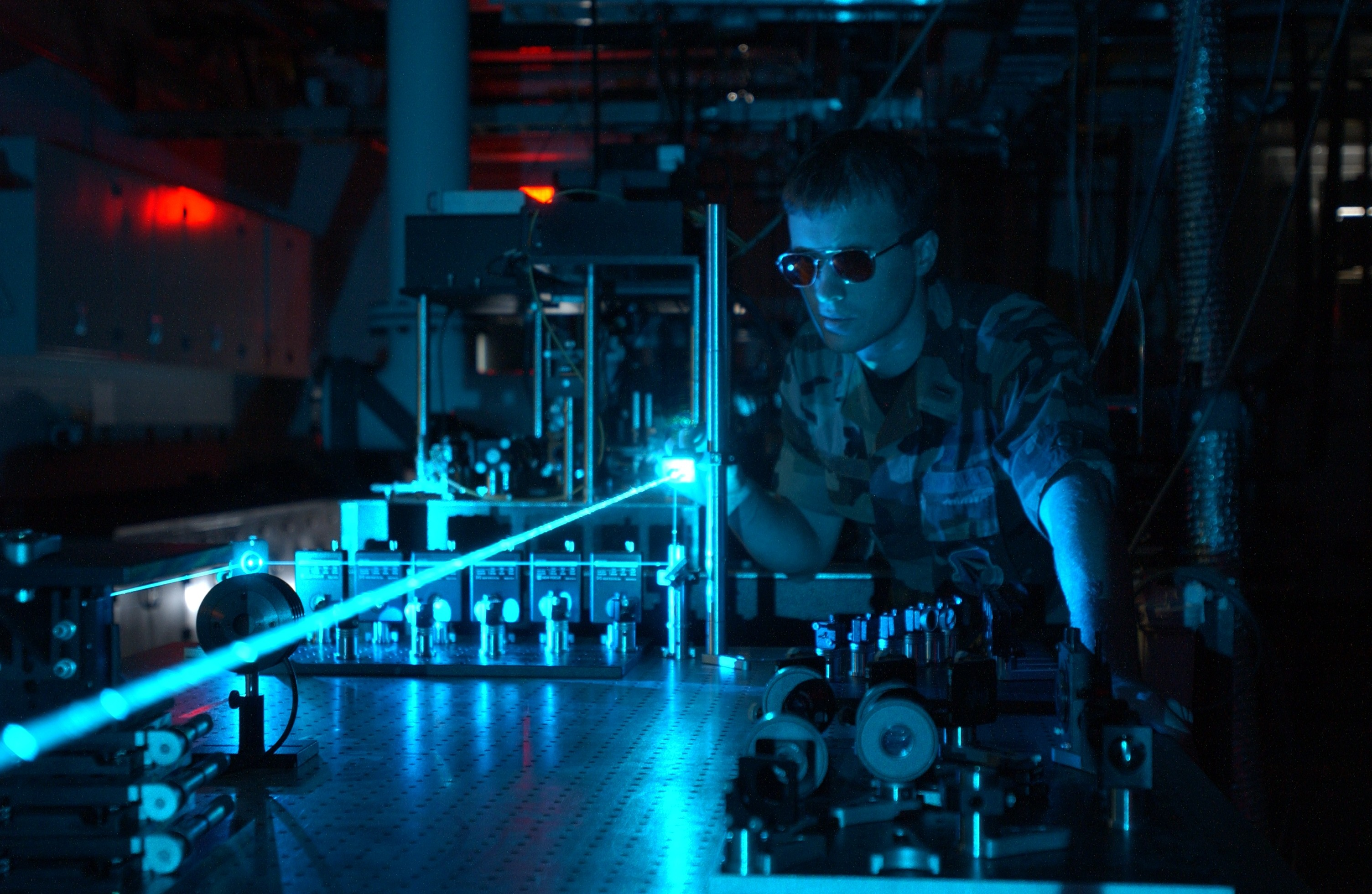
An experiment with a laser

A laser is a device that emits electromagnetic radiation through a process called stimulated emission. Laser light is usually spatially coherent, which means that the light either is emitted in a narrow, low-divergence beam, or can be converted into one with the help of optical components such as lenses. In 1957, American physicist Gordon Gould first theorized the idea and use of laser technology. Despite a 35-year battle with the United States Patent and Trademark Office, Gould is now widely, yet not universally known as the original inventor of laser. However, Gould never developed or produced the first working laser. While working at Hughes Research Laboratories, physicist Theodore H. Maiman created the first laser in 1960. The core of his laser consisted of a man-made ruby, a material that had been judged unsuitable by other scientists who rejected crystal cores in favor of various gases.

1957 Confocal microscopy

Confocal microscopy is an optical imaging technique used to increase micrograph contrast and to reconstruct three-dimensional images by using a spatial pinhole to eliminate out-of-focus light or flare in specimens that are thicker than the focal plane. This technique has gained popularity in the scientific and industrial communities. Typical applications include life sciences and semiconductor inspection. The principle of confocal imaging was invented and patented by Marvin Minsky in 1957.

1957 Air-bubble packing

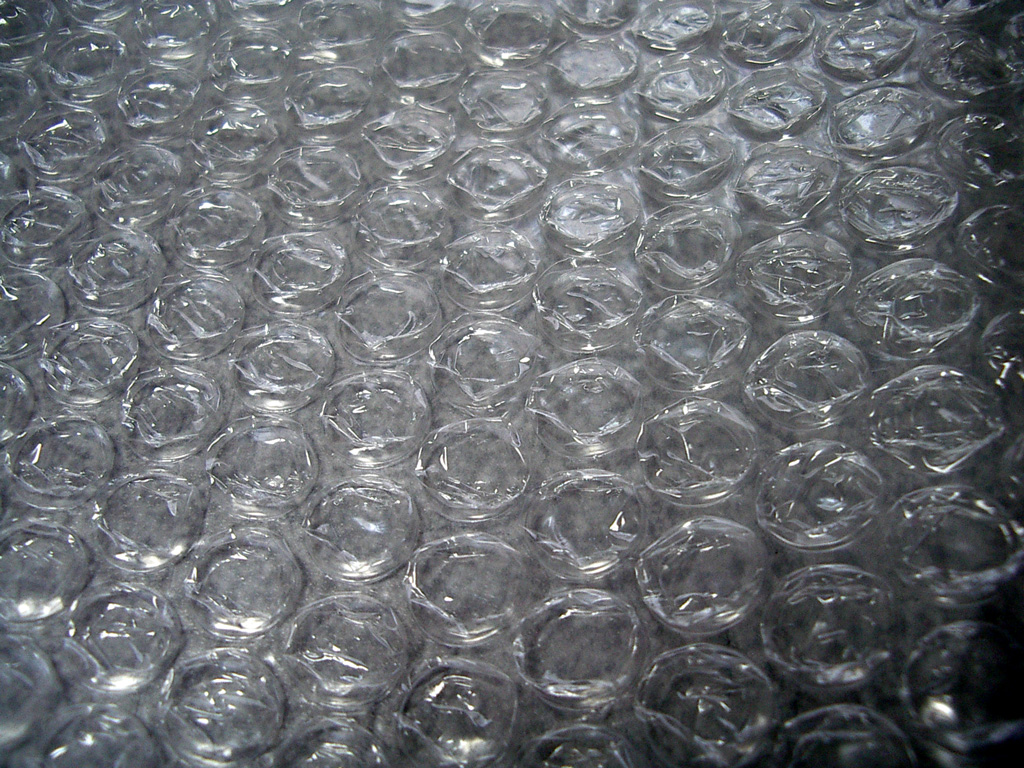
Air-bubble packing, popularly known by the brand name Bubble Wrap

Better known by the brand name of Bubble Wrap, air-bubble packing is a pliable transparent plastic material commonly used for the cushioning of fragile, breakable items in order to absorb or minimize shock and vibration. Regularly spaced, the protruding air-filled hemispheres are known as "bubbles" which are 1/4 inch (6 millimeters) in diameter, to as large as an inch (26 millimeters) or more. Air-bubble packing was co-invented by Alfred Fielding and Marc Chavannes in 1957.

1957 Borazon

Borazon, a boron nitride allotrope, is the fourth hardest substance, after aggregated diamond nanorods, ultrahard fullerite, and diamond, and the third hardest artificial material. Borazon is a crystal created by heating equal quantities of boron and nitrogen at temperatures greater than 1800 °Celsius, 3300 °Fahrenheit at 7 gigapascal 1 millionpound-force per square inch. Borazon was first invented in 1957 by Robert H. Wentorf, Jr., a physical chemist working for the General Electric Company. In 1969, General Electric adopted the name Borazon as its trademark for the crystal.

1957 Gamma camera

A gamma camera is a device used to image gamma radiation emitting radioisotopes, a technique known as scintigraphy. The applications of scintigraphy include early drug development and nuclear medical imaging to view and analyse images of the human body of the distribution of medically injected, inhaled, or ingested radionuclides emitting gamma rays. The gamma camera was invented by Hal Anger in 1957.

1957 Cryotron

- The cryotron is a switch that operates using superconductivity. The cryotron works on the principle that magnetic fields destroy superconductivity. The cryotron was invented by Dudley Buck in 1957.

1958 Lisp programming language

- Lisp is a family of computer programming languages with a long history and a distinctive, fully parenthesized syntax. Originally specified in 1958, Lisp is the second-oldest high-level programming language in widespread use today where Fortran is the oldest. It was invented by John McCarthy in 1958.

1958 Carbon fiber

- Carbon fiber is a material consisting of extremely thin fibers about 0.005–0.010 mm in diameter and composed mostly of carbon atoms. In 1958, Dr. Roger Bacon invented the first high-performance carbon fibers at the Union Carbide Parma Technical Center, located outside of Cleveland, Ohio.

1958 Integrated circuit

The integrated circuit

An integrated circuit is a miniaturized electronic circuit that has been manufactured in the surface of a thin substrate of semiconductor material. Integrated circuits are used in almost all electronic equipment in use today and have revolutionized the world of electronics. The integration of large numbers of tiny transistors into a small chip was an enormous improvement over the manual assembly of circuits using discrete electronic components. On September 12, 1958, Jack Kilby developed a piece of germanium with an oscilloscope attached. While pressing a switch, the oscilloscope showed a continuous sine wave, proving that his integrated circuit worked. A patent for a "Solid Circuit made of Germanium", the first integrated circuit, was filed by its inventor, Jack Kilby on February 6, 1959.

1959 Fusor

The fusor is an apparatus invented by Philo T. Farnsworth in 1959 to create nuclear fusion. Unlike most controlled fusion systems, which slowly heat a magnetically confined plasma, the fusor injects "high temperature" ions directly into a reaction chamber, thereby avoiding a considerable amount of complexity. The approach is known as inertial electrostatic confinement.

1959 Weather satellite

- A weather satellite is a type of satellite that is primarily used to monitor the weather and climate of the Earth. The first weather satellite, Vanguard 2, was launched on February 17, 1959, although the first weather satellite to be considered a success was TIROS-1, launched by NASA on April 1, 1960.

1959 Spandex

- Spandex is a synthetic fiber known for its exceptional elasticity that is typically worn as apparel for exercising and in gymnastics. Spandex is stronger and more durable than rubber, its major non-synthetic competitor. Spandex was invented in 1959 by DuPont chemist Joseph Shivers.

== Sixties (1960–1969) ==
1960 Magnetic stripe card

- A magnetic stripe card is a type of card capable of storing data by modifying the magnetism of tiny iron-based magnetic particles on a band of magnetic material on the card. The magnetic stripe, sometimes called a magstripe, is read by physical contact and swiping past a reading head. Magnetic stripe cards are commonly used in credit cards, identity cards such as a driver's license, and transportation tickets. The magnetic stripe card was invented in 1960 by IBM engineer Forrest Parry, who conceived the idea of incorporating a piece of magnetic tape in order to store secured information and data to a plastic card base.

1960 Global navigation satellite system

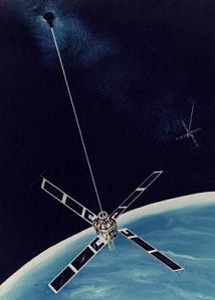
NASA's Transit seen orbiting the earth, was the first operational GNSS in the world

A global navigation satellite system (GNSS) provides autonomous geo-spatial positioning with global coverage. A GNSS allows small electronic receivers to determine their location such as longitude, latitude, and altitude to within a few meters using time signals transmitted along a line of sight by radio from satellites in outer space. Receivers on the ground with a fixed position can also be used to calculate the precise time as a reference for scientific experiments. The first such system was Transit, developed by the Johns Hopkins University Applied Physics Laboratory under the leadership of Richard Kershner. Development of the system for the United States Navy began in 1958, and a prototype satellite,Transit 1A, was launched in September 1959. That satellite failed to reach orbit. A second satellite, Transit 1B, was successfully launched April 13, 1960, by a Thor-Ablestar rocket. The last Transit satellite launch was in August 1988.

1960 Combined oral contraceptive pill

The combined oral contraceptive pill, or birth-control pill, or simply "the Pill", is a combination of an estrogen and a progestin taken orally to inhibit normal female fertility. On May 9, 1960, the FDA announced it would approve Enovid 10 mg for contraceptive use. By the time Enovid 10 mg had been in general use for three years, at least a half a million women had used it. Beginning his research and studies in the feasibility of women's fertility in 1950, Dr. Gregory Pincus invented the combined oral contraceptive pill in 1960.

1960 Obsidian hydration dating

Obsidian hydration dating is a geochemical method of determining age in either absolute or relative terms of an artifact made of obsidian. Obsidian hydration dating was introduced in 1960 by Irving Friedman and Robert Smith of the United States Geological Survey.

1960 Gas laser

A gas laser is a laser in which an electric current is discharged through a gas to produce light. The first gas laser, the Helium-neon, was invented by William R. Bennett, Don Herriott, and Ali Javan in 1960.

1961 Wearable computer

- Wearable computers are computers which can be worn on the body. Wearable computers are especially useful for applications that require computational support while the user's hands, voice, eyes or attention are actively engaged with the physical environment. The wearable computer was first conceived by American mathematician Edward O. Thorp in 1955 and co-invented with American electronic engineer Claude Shannon.

1961 Frozen carbonated beverage

- A frozen carbonated beverage is a mixture of flavored sugar syrup, carbon dioxide, and water that is frozen by a custom machine creating a drink consisting of a fine slush of suspended ice crystals, with very little liquid. In 1961, Omar Knedlik of Coffeyville, Kansas invented the first frozen carbonated drink machine and is thus recognized as the inventor of the frozen carbonated beverage. In 1965, 7-Eleven licensed the machine, and began selling Knedlik's invention by the brand name popularly known as Slurpee.

1961 Biofeedback

- Biofeedback is a form of alternative medicine that involves measuring a subject's quantifiable bodily functions such as blood pressure, heart rate, skin temperature, sweat gland activity, and muscle tension, conveying the information to the patient in real-time. This raises the patient's awareness and conscious control of his or her unconscious physiological activities. Neal Miller is generally considered the father of modern-day biofeedback. Miller theorized the basic principles of biofeedback by applying his theory that classical and operant conditioning were both the result of a common learning principle in 1961. Miller hypothesized that any measurable physiological behavior within the human body would respond in some way to voluntary control.

1962 Communications satellite

- A communications satellite is an artificial satellite stationed in space for the purposes of telecommunications. Modern communications satellites use a variety of orbits. For fixed point-to-point services, communications satellites provide a microwave radio relay technology complementary to that of submarine communication cables. Invented in 1962 by the American aerospace engineer John Robinson Pierce, NASA launched Telstar, the world's first active communications satellite, and the first satellite designed to transmit telephone and high-speed data communications. Its name is still used to this day for a number of television broadcasting satellites.

1962 Light-emitting diode

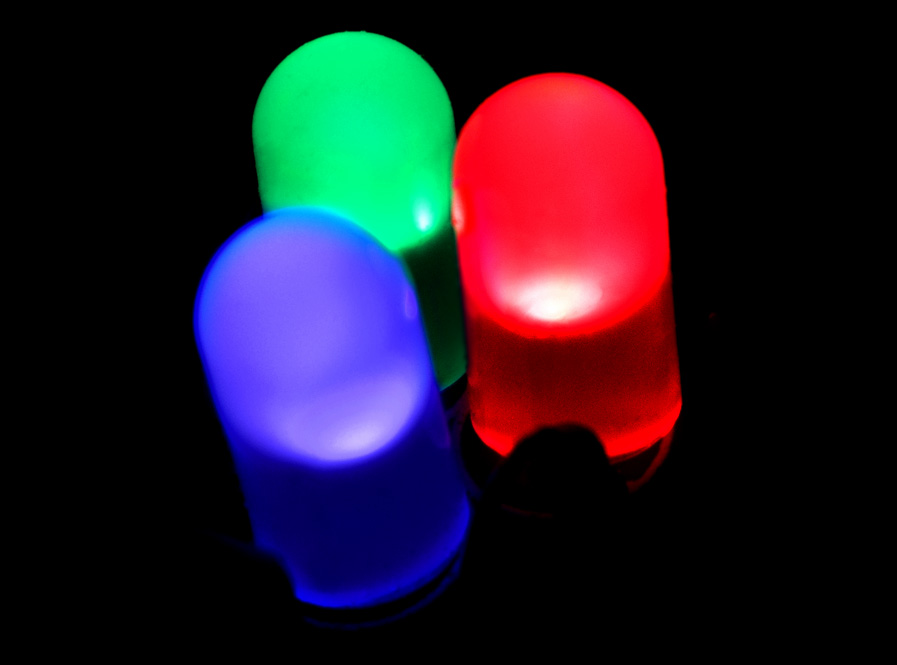
Blue, green, and red LEDs can be combined to produce most perceptible colors, including white.

A light-emitting-diode (LED) is a semiconductor diode that emits light when an electric current is applied in the forward direction of the device, as in the simple LED circuit. The effect is a form of electroluminescence where incoherent and narrow-spectrum light is emitted from the p-n junction in a solid state material. The first practical visible-spectrum LED was invented in 1962 by Nick Holonyak Jr.

1962 Electret microphone

An electret microphone is a type of condenser microphone, which eliminates the need for a power supply by using a permanently charged material. Electret materials have been known since the 1920s, and were proposed as condenser microphone elements several times, but were considered impractical until the foil electret type was invented at Bell Laboratories in 1962 by Jim West, using a thin metallized Teflon foil. This became the most common type, used in many applications from high-quality recording and lavalier use to built-in microphones in small sound recording devices and telephones.

1962 Jet injector

A jet injector is a type of medical injecting syringe that uses a high-pressure narrow jet of the injection liquid instead of a hypodermic needle to penetrate the epidermis. The jet injector was invented by Aaron Ismach in 1962.

1962 Laser diode

- A laser diode is a laser where the active medium is a semiconductor similar to that found in a light-emitting diode. The most common and practical type of laser diode is formed from a p-n junction and powered by injected electric current. These devices are sometimes referred to as injection laser diodes to distinguish them from optically pumped laser diodes, which are more easily manufactured in the laboratory. The laser diode was invented in 1962 by Robert N. Hall.

1962 Glucose meter

- A glucose meter is a medical device for determining the approximate concentration of glucose in the blood. The first glucose meter was invented by Leland Clark and Ann Lyons at the Cincinnati Children's Hospital which was first known as a glucose enzyme electrode. The sensor worked by measuring the amount of oxygen consumed by the enzyme.

1963 Computer mouse

In computing, a mouse is a pointing device that functions by detecting two-dimensional motion relative to its supporting surface. The mouse's motion typically translates into the motion of a pointer on a display, which allows for fine control of a Graphical User Interface. Douglas Engelbart invented the computer mouse at the Stanford Research Institute in 1963.

1963 Lung transplantation

Lung transplantation is a surgical procedure in which a patient's diseased lungs are partially or totally replaced by lungs which come from a donor. Lung transplantation is the therapeutic measure of last resort for patients with end-stage lung disease who have exhausted all other available treatments without improvement. A variety of conditions may make such surgery necessary. Dr. James Hardy of the University of Mississippi Medical Center performed the first human lung transplant, the left lung, in 1963.

1963 BASIC

In computer programming, BASIC is a family of high-level programming languages. The original BASIC was invented in 1963 by John George Kemeny and Thomas Eugene Kurtz at Dartmouth College in New Hampshire to provide computer access to non-science students. At the time, nearly all use of computers required writing custom software, which was something only scientists and mathematicians tended to be able to do. The language and its variants became widespread on microcomputers in the late 1970s and 1980s.

1963 Balloon catheter

- A balloon catheter is a type of "soft" catheter with an inflatable "balloon" at its tip which is used during a catheterization procedure to enlarge a narrow opening or passage within the body. The deflated balloon catheter is positioned, then inflated to perform the necessary procedure, and deflated again in order to be removed. A common use includes angioplasty. In 1963, Dr. Thomas Fogarty invented and patented the balloon catheter.

1963 Geosynchronous satellite

- A geosynchronous satellite is a satellite whose orbital track on the Earth repeats regularly over points on the Earth over time. The world's first geosynchronous satellite, the Syncom II which was launched on a Delta rocket at NASA in 1963, was invented by Harold Rosen.

1963 Neutron bomb

- A neutron bomb, technically referred to as an enhanced radiation weapon, is a type of tactical nuclear weapon formerly built mainly by the United States specifically to release a large portion of its energy as energetic neutron radiation. Samuel Cohen is credited with the conception of the neutron bomb and its testing was authorized and carried out in 1963 at an underground Nevada test facility.

1964 Plasma display

- A plasma display panel is a flat panel display common to large TV displays. Many tiny cells between two panels of glass hold an inert mixture of noble gases. The gas in the cells is electrically turned into a plasma which then excites phosphors to emit light. The monochrome plasma video display was co-invented in 1964 at the University of Illinois at Urbana-Champaign by Donald Bitzer, H. Gene Slottow, and graduate student Robert Willson for the PLATO Computer System.

1964 8-track cartridge

- Stereo 8, commonly known as the eight-track cartridge or eight-track, is a magnetic tape sound recording technology. In 1964, William Lear invented the eight-track, which went on to become the most popular musical medium from the mid-1960s to the early 1980s.

1964 Permanent press

- A permanent press is a characteristic of fabric that has been chemically processed to resist wrinkles and hold its shape. This treatment has a lasting effect on the fabric, namely in shirts, trousers, and slacks. Permanent press was invented in 1964 by Ruth Rogan Benerito, research leader of the Physical Chemistry Research Group of the Cotton Chemical Reactions Laboratory.

1964 Heart transplantation

- Heart transplantation or cardiac transplantation, is a surgical transplant procedure performed on patients with end-stage heart failure or severe coronary artery disease. The most common procedure is to take a working heart from a recently deceased organ donor and implant it into the patient. The patient's own heart may either be removed or, less commonly, left in to support the donor heart. It is also possible to take a heart from another speciesor implant or a man-made artificial heart. The first heart transplanted into a human occurred in 1964 at the University of Mississippi Medical Center in Jackson, Mississippi when a team led by Dr. James Hardy transplanted a chimpanzee heart into a dying patient.

1964 Artificial turf

- Artificial turf, or synthetic turf, is a man-made surface made to look like natural grass. It is most often used in arenas for sports that were originally or are normally played on grass. David Chaney, who moved to Raleigh, North Carolina in 1960 and later served as dean of the North Carolina State University College of Textiles, headed the team of RTP researchers who created the famous artificial turf. Artificial turf was co-invented in 1964 by James M. Faria and Robert T. Wright, employees of Monsanto Company. Widely known as Astroturf, it was invented in 1964 by James M. Faria and Robert T. Wright and patented in 1967, originally sold under the name "Chemgrass".

1964 Carbon dioxide laser

- The carbon dioxide laser was one of the earliest gas lasers to be developed and is still one of the most useful. The carbon dioxide laser was invented by C. Kumar N. Patel of Bell Labs in 1964.

1964 Liquid crystal display (Dynamic Scattering Mode)

- A liquid crystal display (LCD) is an electronically modulated optical device shaped into a thin, flat panel made up of any number of color or monochrome pixels filled with liquid crystals and arrayed in front of a light source or reflector. In 1964, George H. Heilmeier invented the dynamic scattering mode found in liquid crystal displays, wherein an electrical charge is applied which rearranges the molecules so that they scatter light.

1964 SQUID

- Superconducting Quantum Interference Devices are very sensitive magnetometers used to measure extremely small magnetic fields based on superconducting loops containing Josephson junctions. The DC SQUID was invented in 1964 by Arnold Silver, Robert Jaklevic, John Lambe, and James Mercereau of Ford Research Labs.

1964 Argon laser

- The argon laser is one of a family of ion lasers that use a noble gas as the active medium. The argon laser was invented by William Bridges in 1964.

1965 Automatic adaptive equalizer

- An automatic adaptive equalizer corrects distorted signals, greatly improving data performance and speed. All computer modems use equalizers. The automatic adaptive equalizer was invented in 1965 by Bell Laboratories electrical engineer Robert Lucky.

1965 Snowboarding

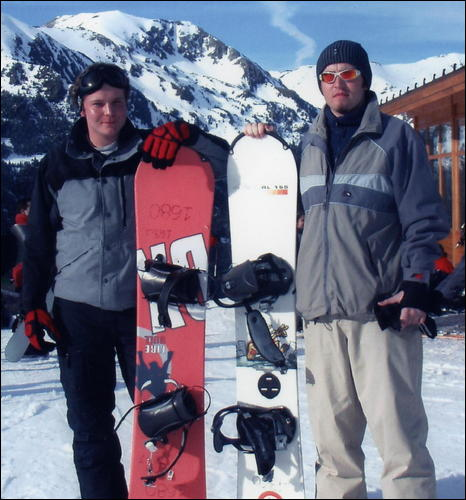
Snowboarders at a ski resort

Snowboarding is a sport that involves descending a slope that is either partially or fully covered with snow on a snowboard attached to a rider's feet using a special boot set into a mounted binding. The development of snowboarding was inspired by skateboarding, surfing and skiing. The first snowboard, the Snurfer, was invented by Sherman Poppen in 1965. Snowboarding became an Winter Olympic Sport in 1998.

1965 Kevlar

Kevlar is the registered trademark for a light, strong para-aramid synthetic fiber. Typically it is spun into ropes or fabric sheets that can be used as such or as an ingredient in composite material components. Currently, Kevlar has many applications, ranging from bicycle tires and racing sails to body armor because of its high strength-to-weight ratio. Invented at DuPont in 1965 by Stephanie Kwolek, Kevlar was first commercially used in the early 1970s as a replacement for steel in racing tires.

1965 Hypertext

Hypertext most often refers to text on a computer that will lead the user to other, related information on demand. It is a relatively recent innovation to user interfaces, which overcomes some of the limitations of written text. Rather than remaining static like traditional text, hypertext makes possible a dynamic organization of information through links and connections called hyperlinks. Ted Nelson coined the words "hypertext" and "hypermedia" in 1965 and invented the Hypertext Editing System in 1968 at Brown University.

1965 Cordless telephone

- A cordless telephone is a telephone with a wireless handset that communicates via radio waves with a base station connected to a fixed telephone line, usually within a limited range of its base station. The base station is on the subscriber premises, and attaches to the telephone network the same way a corded telephone does. In 1965, an American woman named Teri Pall invented the cordless telephone. Due to difficulties of marketing, Pall never patented her invention. George Sweigert of Euclid, Ohio had more success, thus receiving a patent for the cordless telephone in 1969.

1965 Space pen

- The Space Pen, also known as the Zero Gravity Pen, is a pen that uses pressurized ink cartridges and is claimed to write in zero gravity, upside down, underwater, over wet and greasy paper, at any angle, and in extreme temperature ranges. The ballpoint is made from tungsten carbide and is precisely fitted in order to avoid leaks. A sliding float separates the ink from the pressurized gas. The thixotropic ink in the hermetically sealed and pressurized reservoir is claimed to write for three times longer than a standard ballpoint pen. In 1965, the space pen was invented and patented by Paul C. Fisher. After two years of testing at NASA, the space pen was fist used during the Apollo 7 mission in 1968.

1965 Minicomputer

- A minicomputer is a class of multi-user computers that lies in the middle range of the computing spectrum, in between the largest multi-user systems and the smallest single-user systems. Wesley A. Clark and Charles Molnar co-invented the PDP-8 in 1965, the world's first minicomputer, using integrated circuit technology. Because of its relatively small size and its $18,000 price tag, Digital Equipment only sold several hundred units.

1965 Compact disc

The compact disc

The Compact Disc, or CD, is an optical disc used to store digital data, originally developed for storing digital audio. While working at Pacific Northwest National Laboratory, James Russell invented the compact disc, later presenting and selling the rights to companies such as Sony and Philips who commercialized the compact disc beginning in 1980. Russell currently holds 22 legal patents relating to his inventions in optical recording and playback as well as the compact disc.

1965 Chemical laser

A chemical laser is a laser that obtains its energy from a chemical reaction. Chemical lasers can achieve continuous wave output with power reaching to megawatt levels. They are used in industry for cutting and drilling, and in military as directed-energy weapons. The first chemical laser was co-invented by Jerome V. V. Kasper and George C. Pimentel in 1965.

1966 Dynamic random access memory

Dynamic random access memory is a type of random access memory that stores each bit of data in a separate capacitor within an integrated circuit. Since real capacitors leak charge, the information eventually fades unless the capacitor charge is refreshed periodically. Because of this refresh requirement, it is a dynamic memory as opposed to static random access memory and other static memory. In 1966 DRAM was invented by Robert Dennard at the IBM Thomas J. Watson Research Center.

1967 Food bank

- A food bank is a non-profit organization which distributes non-perishable goods and perishable food items to non-profit agencies involved in local emergency food programs. The first food bank was St. Mary's Food Bank started in 1967 in Phoenix, Arizona.

1967 Airbag

- An airbag is a vehicle safety device. It is an occupant restraint consisting of a flexible envelope designed to inflate rapidly in an automobile collision, to prevent vehicle occupants from striking hard interior objects such as steering wheels. An American inventor, Dr. Allen S. Breed, invented and developed a key component for automotive use in 1967, the ball-in-tube inertial sensor for crash detection. Breed Corporation then marketed this innovation first in 1967 to Chrysler.

1967 Hand-held calculator

- Invented by Jack Kilby in 1967, the hand-held calculator is a device for performing mathematical calculations, distinguished from a computer by having a limited problem solving ability and an interface optimized for interactive calculation rather than programming. Calculators can be hardware or software, and mechanical or electronic, and are often built into devices such as PDAs or mobile phones.

1968 Lunar Module

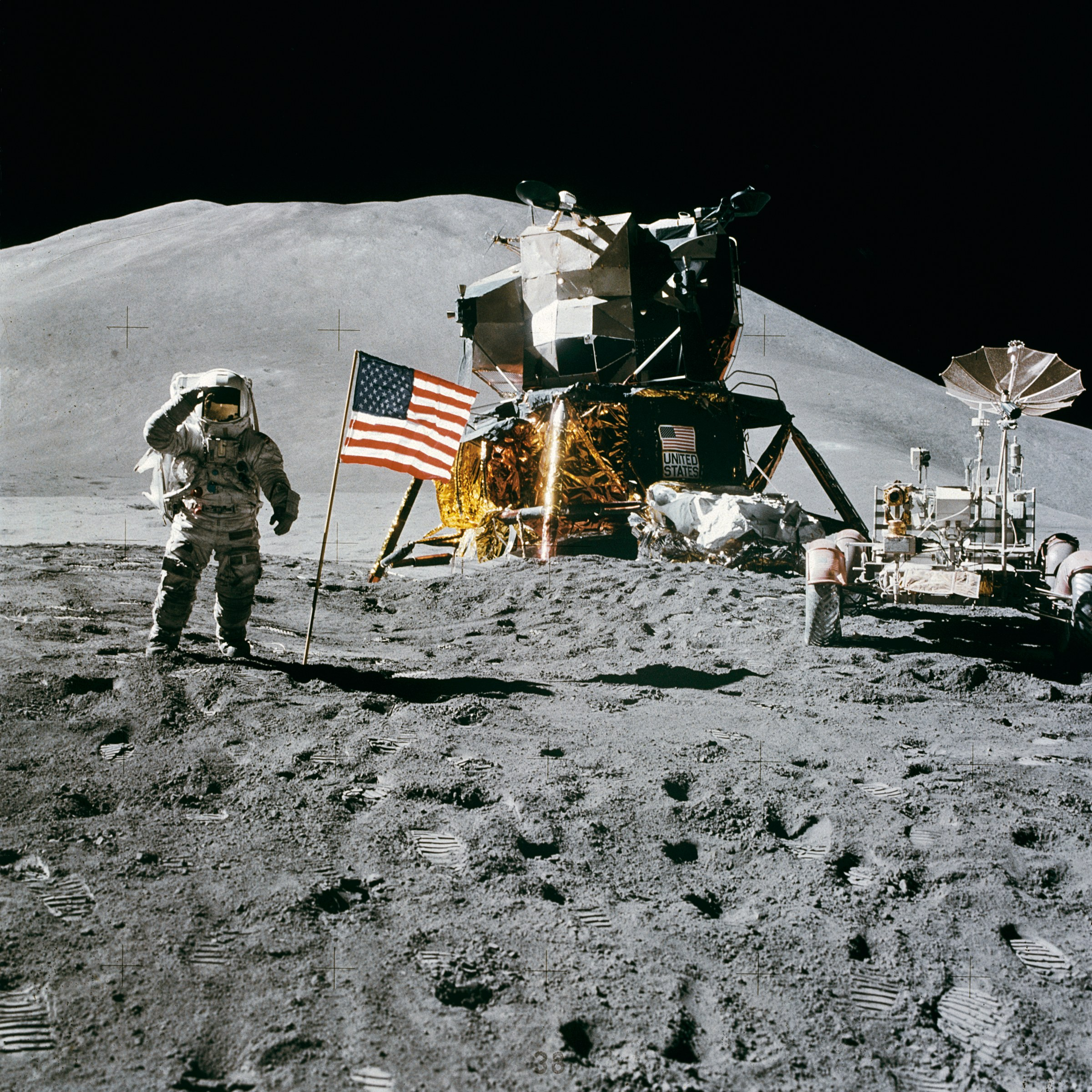
Apollo Lunar Module

The Lunar Module was the lander portion of the Apollo spacecraft built for the Apollo program by Grumman in order to achieve the transit from cislunar orbit to the surface and back. The module was also known as the LM from the manufacturer designation. Tom Kelly as a project engineer at Grumman, successfully designed and built the first Lunar Module. NASA achieved the first test flight on January 22, 1968, using a Saturn V rocket. Six successful missions carried twelve astronauts, the first being Neil Armstrong and Buzz Aldrin, to the Moon surface and safely back home to Earth.

1968 Virtual reality

Virtual reality (VR) is a technology which allows a user to interact with a computer-simulated environment. Most current virtual reality environments are primarily visual experiences, displayed either on a computer screen or through special or stereoscopic displays, but some simulations include additional sensory information, such as sound through speakers or headphones. In 1968, Ivan Sutherland, with the help of his student Bob Sproull, invented what is widely considered to be the first virtual reality and augmented reality (AR) head mounted display (HMD) system. It was primitive both in terms of user interface and realism, and the HMD to be worn by the user was so heavy it had to be suspended from the ceiling, and the graphics comprising the virtual environment were simple wireframe model rooms. In 1989, Jaron Lanier, the founder of VPL Research popularized the concept of virtual reality with his "google n' gloves" system.

1968 Racquetball

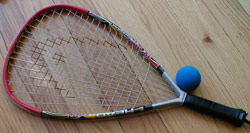
A typical racquetball racquet and ball

Racquetball is a racquet sport played with a hollow rubber ball in an indoor or outdoor court. Joe Sobek is credited with inventing the sport of racquetball in the Greenwich YMCA, though not with naming it. A professional tennis player and handball player, Sobek sought a fast-paced sport that was easy to learn and play. He designed the first strung paddle, devised a set of codified rules, and named his game "paddle rackets."

1968 Crash test dummy

A crash test dummy is a full-scale anthropomorphic test device that simulates the dimensions, weight proportions and articulation of the human body, and is usually instrumented to record data about the dynamic behavior of the ATD in simulated vehicle impacts. The first crash test dummy was invented by Samuel W. Alderson in 1968.

1968 Bone marrow transplantation (non-cancer patient)

The first physician to perform a successful human bone marrow transplantation for a non-cancer patient was Robert A. Good at the University of Minnesota in 1968.

1969 Laser printer

- A laser printer is a common type of computer printer that rapidly produces high quality text and graphics on plain paper. The laser printer was invented at Xerox in 1969 by researcher Gary Starkweather, who had an improved printer working by 1971 and incorporated into a fully functional networked printer system by about a year later.

1969 Wide-body aircraft

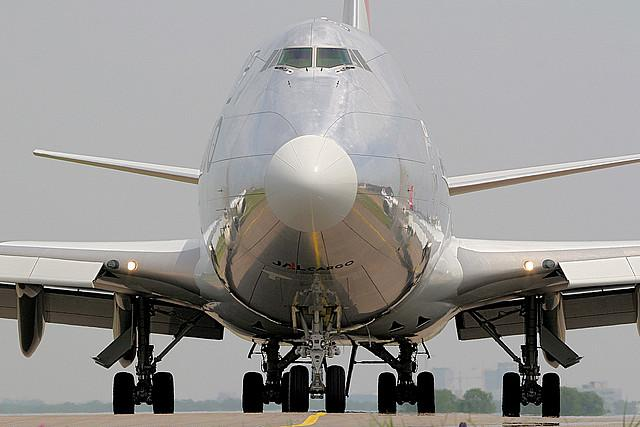
Boeing 747: Queen of the Skies

A wide-body aircraft is a large airliner with two passenger aisles, also known as a twin-aisle aircraft. As the world's first wide-body aircraft, the Boeing 747, also referred to as a jumbo jet, revolutionized international travel around the globe by making non-stop and long-distance travel accessible for all. Joe Sutter, the chief engineer of the jumbo jet program at The Boeing Company designed the world's first wide-body aircraft, the Boeing 747, with its first test flight on February 9, 1969.

1969 Taser

A Taser is an electroshock weapon that uses Electro-Muscular Disruption (EMD) technology to cause neuromuscular incapacitation (NMI) and strong muscle contractions through the involuntary stimulation of both the sensory nerves and the motor nerves. The Taser is not dependent on pain compliance, making it highly effective on subjects with high pain tolerance. For this reason it is preferred by law enforcement over traditional stun guns and other electronic control weapons. Jack Cover, a NASA researcher, invented the Taser in 1969.

1969 Smoke detector

- A smoke detector is a device that detects smoke and issues a signal. Most smoke detectors work either by optical detection or by physical process, but some of them use both detection methods to increase sensitivity to smoke. Smoke detectors are usually powered by battery while some are connected directly to power mains, often having a battery as a power supply backup in case the mains power fails. In 1969, two Americans Kenneth House and Randolph Smith co-invented the first battery powered smoke detector for home use.

1969 Bioactive glass

- Bioactive glasses are a group of surface reactive glass-ceramics. The biocompatibility of these glasses has led them to be investigated extensively for use as implant materials in the human body to repair and replace diseased or damaged bone. Bioactive glass was invented in 1969 by Larry Hench and his colleagues at the University of Florida.

1969 Mousepad

- A mousepad is a hard surface, square-shaped and rubberized mat for enhancing the usability of a computer mouse. Jack Kelley invented the mousepad in 1969.

1969 Chapman Stick

- A polyphonic member of the guitar family, the Chapman Stick is an electric musical instrument used for music recordings to play various parts such as bass, lead, chords, and textures. The Chapman Stick looks like a wide version of the fretboard of an electric guitar, but having 8, 10 or 12 strings. The player will use both hands to sound notes by striking the strings against the fingerboard just behind the appropriate frets for the desired notes. The Chapman Stick was invented in 1969 by American jazz musician Emmett Chapman.

== The Seventies (1970–1979) ==
1970 Wireless local area network

- A wireless local area network is the linking of two or more computers or devices using spread-spectrum or OFDM modulation technology based to enable communication between devices in a limited area. In 1970, the University of Hawaii, under the leadership of Norman Abramson, invented the world's first computer communication network using low-cost ham-like radios, named ALOHAnet. The bidirectional star topology of the system included seven computers deployed over four islands to communicate with the central computer on the Oahu Island without using phone lines.

1970 Optical fiber

- An optical fiber is a glass or plastic fiber that carries light along its length. Optical fibers are widely used in fiber-optic communications, which permits transmission over longer distances and at higher data rates. Robert D. Maurer, Donald Keck, Peter C. Schultz, and Frank Zimar, researchers at Corning Glass, co-invented glass fiber so clear that it could transmit pulses of light. GTE and AT&T soon began experimenting in order to transmit sound and image data using fiber optics, which transformed the communications industry.

1971 Personal computer

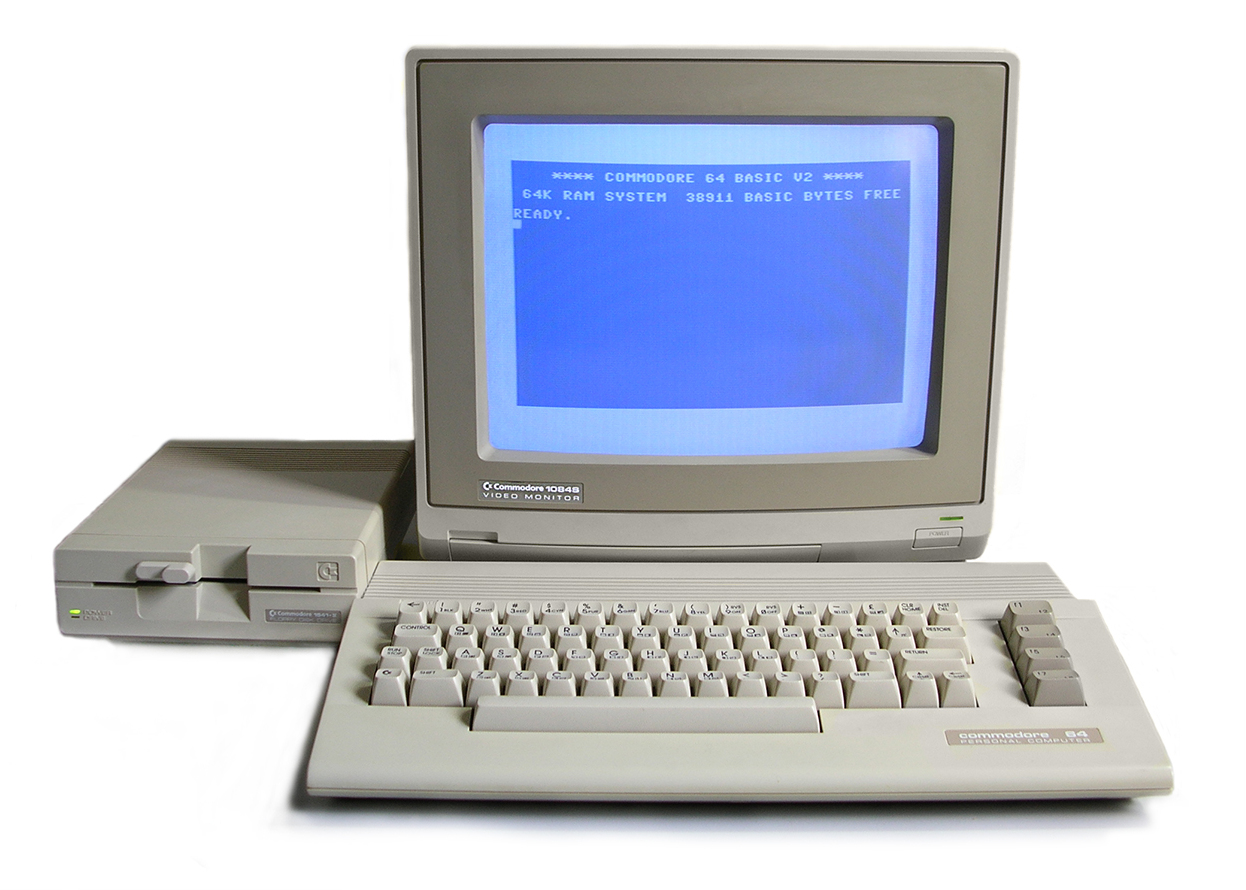
An early personal computer

The personal computer (PC) is any computer whose original sales price, size, and capabilities make it useful for individuals, and which is intended to be operated directly by an end user, with no intervening computer operator. The Kenbak-1 is officially credited by the Computer History Museum to be the world's first personal computer which was invented in 1971 by John Blankenbaker. With a price tag of $750 and after selling only 40 machines, Kenbak Corporation closed its doors in 1973.

1971 Liquid crystal display (TN Field Effect)

A liquid crystal display (LCD) is an electronically modulated optical device shaped into a thin, flat panel made up of any number of color or monochrome pixels filled with liquid crystals and arrayed in front of a light source or reflector. James Fergason at the Westinghouse Research Laboratories in Pittsburgh while working with Sardari Arora and Alfred Saupe at Kent State University co-invented the TN-effect of LCD technology. The Liquid Crystal Institute produced the first LCDs based on the TN-effect, which soon superseded the poor-quality DSM types due to improvements of lower operating voltages and lower power consumption. Twisted nematic displays contain liquid crystal elements which twist and untwist at varying degrees to allow light to pass through. When no voltage is applied to a TN liquid crystal cell, the light is polarized to pass through the cell.

1971 Microprocessor

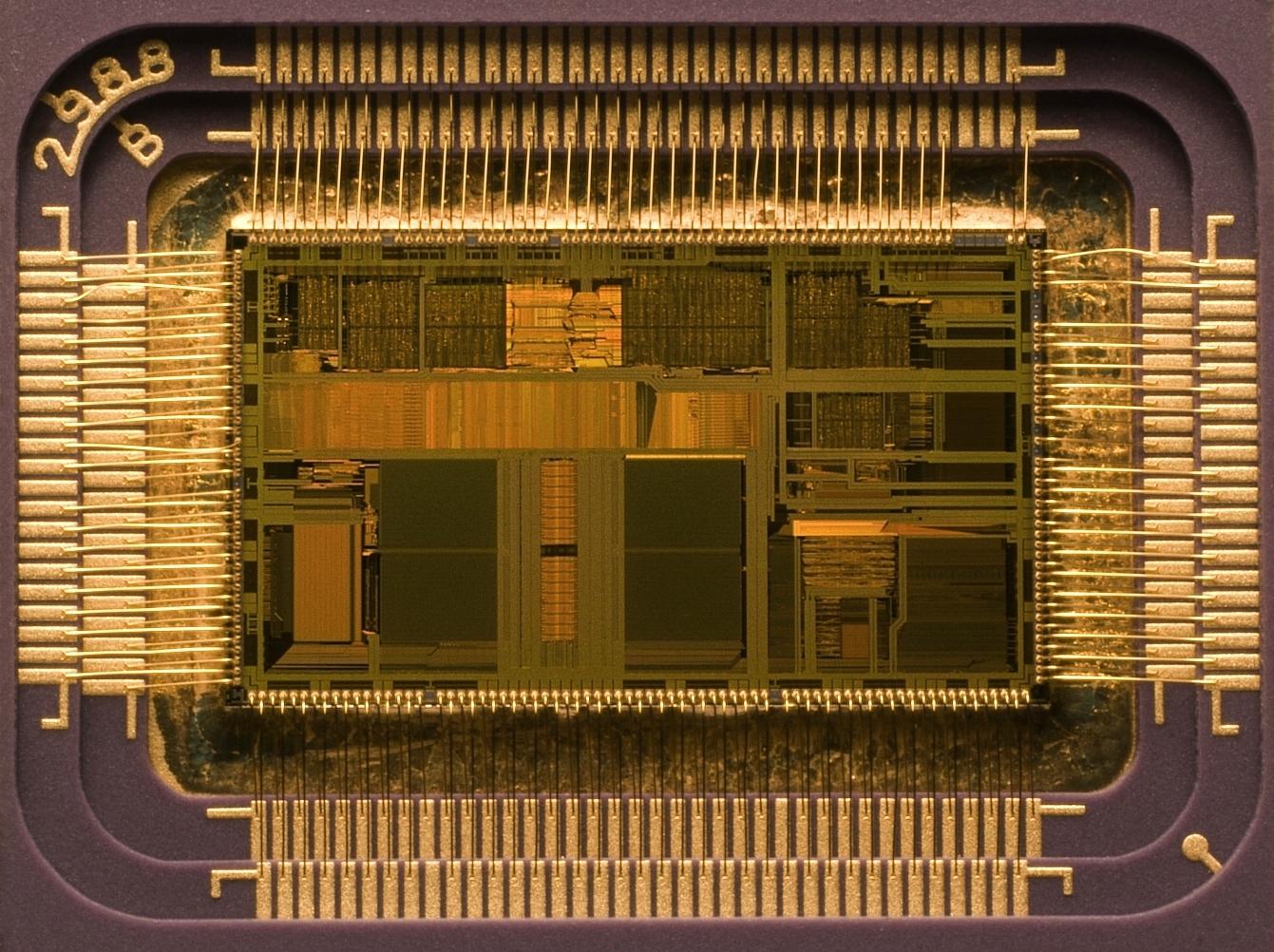
The microprocessor

The microprocessor incorporates most or all of the functions of a central processing unit on a single integrated circuit. The first microprocessor was the 4004, co-invented in 1971 by Ted Hoff, Stanley Mazor, and Federico Faggin for a calculator company named Busicom, and produced by Intel.

1971 Floppy disk

A floppy disk is a data storage medium that is composed of a disk of thin, flexible "floppy" magnetic storage medium encased in a square or rectangular plastic shell. In 1971 while working at IBM, David L. Noble invented the 8-inch floppy disk. Floppy disks in 8-inch, 5¼-inch, and 3½-inch formats enjoyed many years as a popular and ubiquitous form of data storage and exchange, from the mid-1970s to the late 1990s.

1971 Saffir-Simpson Hurricane Scale

The Saffir-Simpson Hurricane Scale is a classification used for most Western Hemisphere tropical cyclones that exceed the intensities of tropical depressions and tropical storms. The scale divides hurricanes into five categories distinguished by the intensities of their sustained winds. The scale was invented by Herbert Saffir and Bob Simpson in 1971.

1971 Fuzzball router

- Fuzzball routers were the first modern routers on the Internet. They were DEC LSI-11 computers loaded with router software. First conceptualized by its inventor, David L. Mills, fuzzball routers evolved as a virtual machine supporting the DEC RT-11 operating system and early developmental versions of the TCP/IP protocol and applications suite. Prototype versions of popular Internet tools, including Telnet, FTP, DNS, EGP and SMTP were first implemented and tested on fuzzball routers.

1971 Supercritical airfoil

- A supercritical airfoil is an airfoil designed, primarily, to delay the onset of wave drag on aircraft in the transonic speed range. Supercritical airfoils are characterized by their flattened upper surface, highly cambered aft section, and greater leading edge radius as compared to traditional airfoil shapes. The supercritical airfoil was invented and designed by NASA aeronautical engineer Richard Whitcomb in the 1960s. Testing successfully commenced on a United States Navy Vought F-8U fighter through wind tunnel results in 1971.

1971 String trimmer

- A string trimmer is a powered handheld device that uses a flexible monofilament line instead of a blade for cutting grass and trimming other plants near objects. It consists of a cutting head at the end of a long shaft with a handle or handles and sometimes a shoulder strap. String trimmers powered by an internal combustion engine have the engine on the opposite end of the shaft from the cutting head while electric string trimmers typically have an electric motor in the cutting head. Used frequently in lawn and garden care, the string trimmer is more popularly known by the brandnames Weedeater or Weedwhacker. The string trimmer was invented in 1971 by George Ballas of Houston, Texas.

1971 E-mail

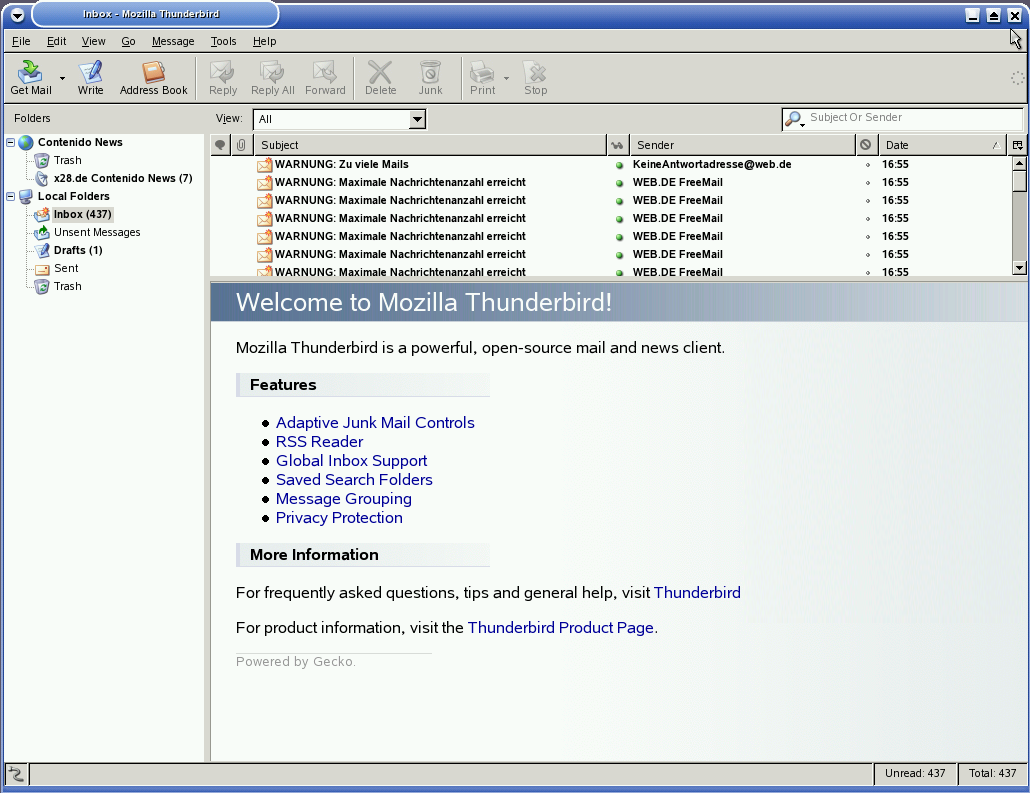
The interface of an e-mail client

Electronic mail, often abbreviated to e-mail, is any method of creating, transmitting, or storing primarily text-based human communications with digital communications systems. Ray Tomlinson as a programmer while working on the United States Department of Defense's ARPANET, invented electronic mail and sent the first message on a time-sharing computer in 1971. Tomlinson is also credited for inventing the "@" sign the mainstream of e-mail communications.

1972 C programming language

C is a general-purpose computer programming language originally invented in 1972 by Dennis Ritchie at the Bell Telephone Laboratories in order to implement the Unix operating system. Although C was designed for writing architecturally independent system software, it is also widely used for developing application software.

1972 Video game console

A video game console is an interactive entertainment computer or electronic device that produces a video display signal which can be used with a display device such as a television to display a video game. A joystick or control pad is often used to simulate and play the video game. It was not until 1972 that Magnavox released the first home video game console, the Magnavox Odyssey, invented by Ralph H. Baer.

1972 PET scanner

- A PET scanner is a commonly used medical device which scans the whole human body for detecting diseases such as cancer. The PET scanner was invented in 1972 by Edward J. Hoffman and fellow scientist Michael Phelps.

1973 Personal watercraft

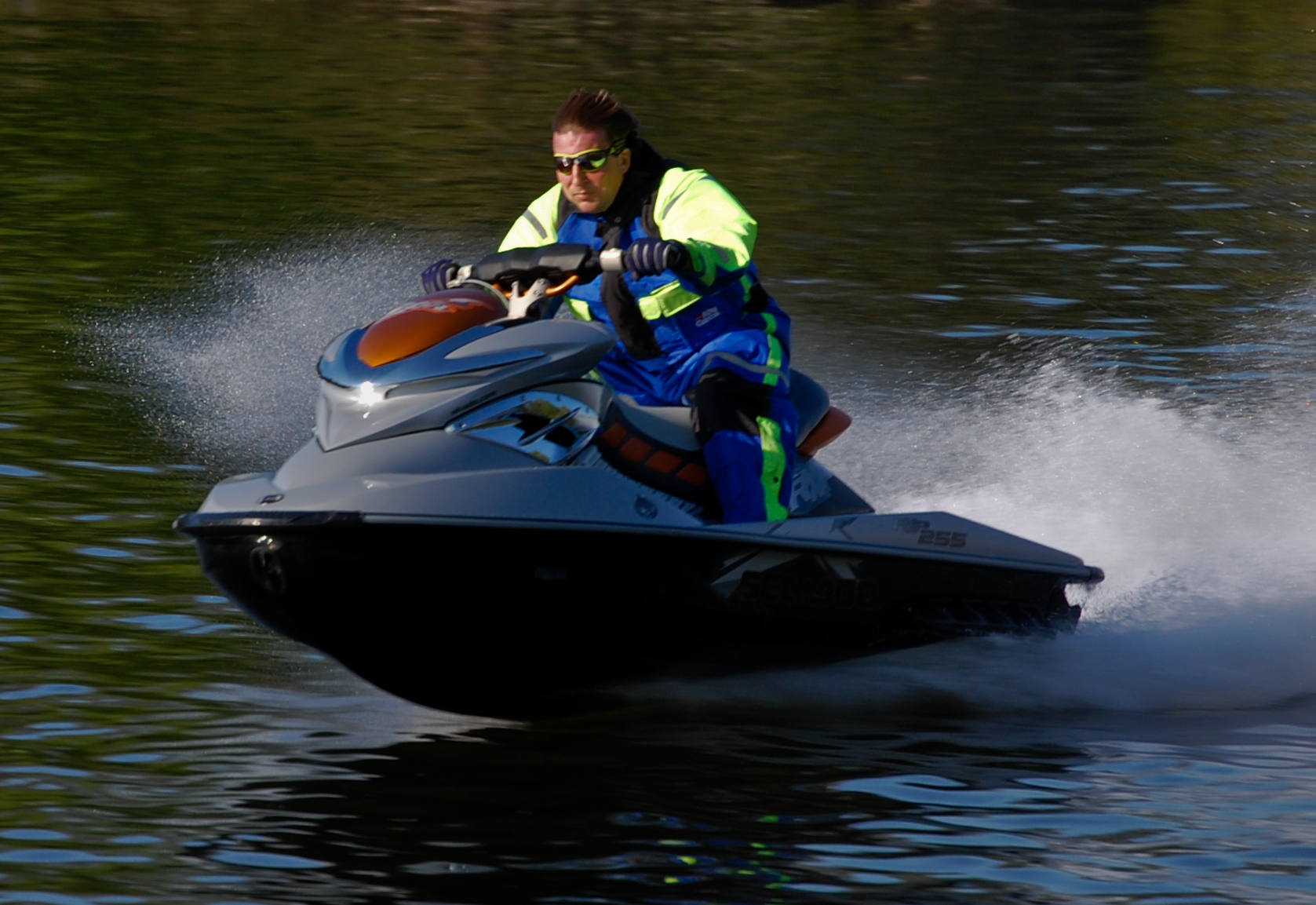
A derivative of a personal water craft

A personal watercraft (PWC) is a recreational watercraft that the rider sits or stands on, rather than inside of, as in a boat. Models have an inboard engine driving a pump jet that has a screw-shaped impeller to create thrust for propulsion and steering. Clayton Jacobson II is credited with inventing the personal watercraft, including both the sit-down and stand-up models in 1973.

1973 E-paper

Electronic paper, also called e-paper, is a display technology designed to mimic the appearance of ordinary ink on paper. Electronic paper reflects light like ordinary paper and is capable of holding text and images indefinitely without drawing electricity, while allowing the image to be changed later. Applications of e-paper technology include e-book readers capable of displaying digital versions of books, magazines and newspapers, electronic pricing labels in retail shops, time tables at bus stations, and electronic billboards. Electronic paper was invented in 1973 by Nick Sheridon at Xerox's Palo Alto Research Center. The first electronic paper, called Gyricon, consisted of polyethylene spheres between 75 and 106 micrometres across.

1973 Recombinant DNA

- Recombinant DNA is a form of synthetic DNA that is engineered through the combination or insertion of one or more DNA strands, thereby combining DNA sequences that would not normally occur together. The Recombinant DNA technique was engineered by Stanley Norman Cohen and Herbert Boyer in 1973. They published their findings in a 1974 paper entitled "Construction of Biologically Functional Bacterial Plasmids in vitro", which described a technique to isolate and amplify genes or DNA segments and insert them into another cell with precision, creating a transgenic bacterium.

1973 Catalytic converter

- A catalytic converter provides an environment for a chemical reaction wherein toxic combustion by-products are converted to less-toxic substances. First used on cars in 1975 to lower emission standards, catalytic converters are also used on generator sets, forklifts, mining equipment, trucks, buses, trains, and other engine-equipped machines. The catalytic converter was co-invented by John J. Mooney and Carl D. Keith at the Engelhard Corporation, creating the first production catalytic converter in 1973.

1974 Operating system

A layer structure showing where the operating system is located on generally used software systems

An operating system is the infrastructure software component of a computer system which is responsible for the management and coordination of activities and the sharing of the limited resources of the computer. The operating system acts as a host for applications that are run on the machine. The first operating system for personal computing, CP/M, was written in 1974 by an American computer scientist and microcomputer entrepreneur named Gary Kildall at Digital Research Inc. At the suggestion of Bill Gates, CP/M in later years was licensed for use by IBM.

1974 Heimlich maneuver

Performing abdominal thrusts, better known as the Heimlich Maneuver, involves a rescuer standing behind a patient and using their hands to exert pressure on the bottom of the diaphragm. This compresses the lungs and exerts pressure on any object lodged in the trachea, hopefully expelling it. This amounts to an artificial cough. Henry Heimlich, as the inventor of his abdominal thrust technique, first published his findings about the maneuver in a June 1974 informal article in Emergency Medicine entitled, "Pop Goes the Cafe Coronary". On June 19, 1974, the Seattle Post-Intelligencer reported that retired restaurant-owner Isaac Piha used the procedure to rescue choking victim Irene Bogachus in Bellevue, Washington.

1974 Post-it note

The Post-it note is a piece of stationery with a re-adherable strip of adhesive on the back, designed for temporarily attaching notes to documents and to other surfaces such as walls, desks and table-tops, computer displays, and so forth. Post-it notes were co-invented by 3M employees Arthur Fry and Spencer Silver in 1974.

1974 Scanning acoustic microscope

A Scanning Acoustic Microscope (SAM) is a device which uses focused sound to investigate, measure, or image an object. It is commonly used in failure analysis and non-destructive evaluation. The first scanning acoustic microscope was co-invented in 1974 by C. F. Lemons and R. A. Quate at the Microwave Laboratory of Stanford University.

1974 Quantum well laser

A quantum well laser is a laser diode in which the active region of the device is so narrow that quantum confinement occurs. The wavelength of the light emitted by a quantum well laser is determined by the width of the active region rather than just the bandgap of the material from which it is constructed. The quantum well laser was invented by Charles H. Henry, a physicist at Bell Labs, in 1974 and was granted a patent for it in 1976.

1974 Universal Product Code

- The Universal Product Code (UPC) is a barcode symbology that scans 12-digits numbers along the bar in order to track trade items and to encode information such as pricing to a product on a store's shelf. The Universal Product Code, invented by George Laurer at IBM, was used on a marked item scanned at a retail checkout, Marsh's supermarket in Troy, Ohio, at 8:01 a.m. on June 26, 1974.

1975 Digital camera

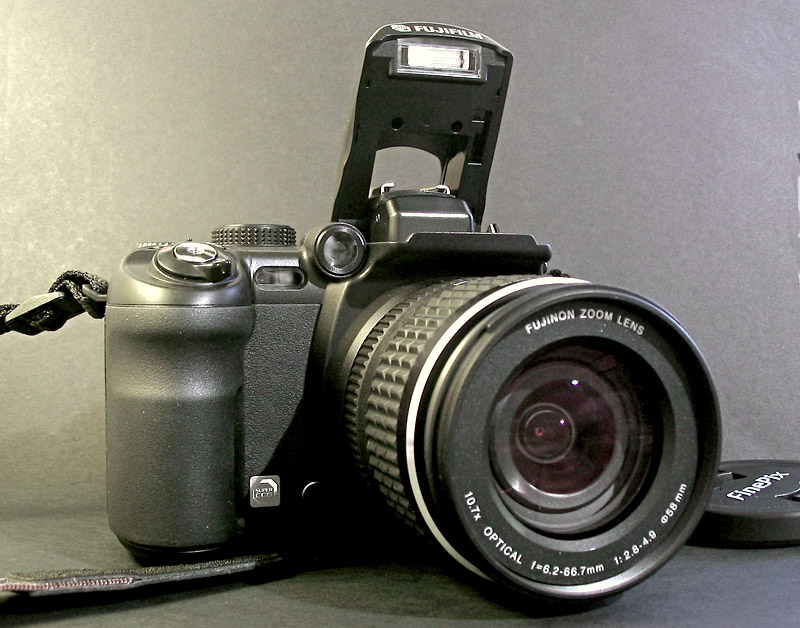
A typical DSLR camera

The digital camera is a camera that takes video or still photographs, digitally by recording images via an electronic image sensor. Steven Sasson as an engineer at Eastman Kodak invented and built the first digital camera using a CCD image sensor in 1975.

1975 Ethernet

The ethernet is a family of frame-based computer networking technologies for local area networks (LANs). The name comes from the physical concept of the ether. It defines a number of wiring and signaling standards for the Physical Layer of the OSI networking model, through means of network access at the Media Access Control (MAC)/Data Link Layer, and a common addressing format. Robert Metcalfe, while at Xerox invented the ethernet in 1975.

1976 Compact fluorescent lamp

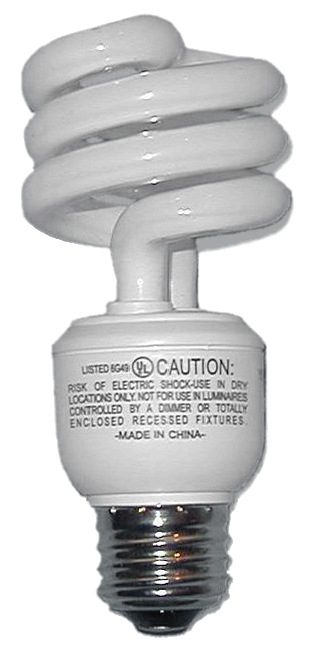
A standard compact fluorescent lamp

A compact fluorescent lamp is designed to produce the same amount of visible light found in incandescent light, yet CFLs generally use 70% less energy and have a longer rated life. In 1976, Ed Hammer invented the first compact fluorescent lamp, but due to the difficulty of the manufacturing process for coating the interior of the spiral glass tube, General Electric did not manufacture or sell the device. Other companies began manufacturing and selling the device in 1995.,

1976 Hepatitis B virus vaccine

After Baruch Samuel Blumberg identified the Hepatitis B virus in 1964, he later developed a diagnostic test and vaccine for the Hepatitis B virus in 1976.

1976 Gore-Tex

Gore-Tex is a waterproof, breathable fabric and is made using an emulsion polymerization process with the fluorosurfactant perfluorooctanoic acid. Gore-Tex was co-invented by Wilbert L. Gore, Rowena Taylor, and Gore's son, Robert W. Gore for use in space. Robert Gore was granted a patent on April 27, 1976, for a porous form of polytetrafluoroethylene with a micro-structure characterized by nodes interconnected by fibrils. Robert Gore, Rowena Taylor, and Samuel Allen were granted a patent on March 18, 1980, for a "waterproof laminate."

1977 Human-powered aircraft

A human-powered aircraft (HPA) is an aircraft powered by direct human energy and the force of gravity. The thrust provided by the human may be the only source. However, a hang glider that is partially powered by pilot power is a human-powered aircraft where the flight path can be enhanced more than if the hang glider had not been assisted by human power. Invented by designer Paul MacCready and constructed of mylar, polystyrene, and carbon-fiber rods, the Gossamer Condor was the world's first practical and successful human-powered aircraft, staying in the air for 7.5 uninterrupted minutes. By 1979, a cyclist named Byron Allen used McCready's successive model known as the Gossamer Albatross, and won British industrialist Henry Kremer's prize of $214,000 for crossing the 22-mile English Channel.

1977 Magnetic resonance imaging

Magnetic resonance imaging (MRI), or nuclear magnetic resonance imaging (NMRI), is primarily a medical imaging technique most commonly used in radiology to visualize the structure and function of the body. Although the development of magnetic resonance imaging was first conceived by Paul Lauterbur who later received a Nobel Prize in 2003 for his groundbreaking work, Raymond Vahan Damadian invented and built the first full-body MRI machine and produced the first full magnetic resonance imaging ("MRI") scan of the human body, albeit using a "focused field" technique that differs considerably from modern imaging.

1977 Chemical oxygen iodine laser

- A chemical oxygen iodine laser is an infrared chemical laser. The chemical oxygen iodine laser was invented by the United States Air Force's Phillips Laboratory in 1977 for military purposes. Its properties make it useful for industrial processing as well; the beam is focusable and can be transferred by an optical fiber, as its wavelength is not absorbed much by fused silica but is very well absorbed by metals, making it suitable for laser cutting and drilling. COIL is the main weapon laser for the military airborne laser and advanced tactical laser programs.

1978 Bulletin board system

- A Bulletin Board System, or BBS, is a computer system running software that allows users to connect and log in to the system using a terminal program. Once logged in, a user can perform functions such as uploading and downloading software and data, reading news and bulletins, and exchanging messages with other users, either through electronic mail or in public message boards. Many BBSes also offer on-line games, in which users can compete with each other, and BBSes with multiple phone lines often provide chat rooms, allowing users to interact with each other. CBBS, the first Bulletin Board System, was invented by Ward Christensen and Randy Suess in Chicago, becoming fully operational on February 16, 1978.

1978 Spreadsheet

- A spreadsheet is a computer application that simulates a paper worksheet. It displays multiple cells that together make up a grid consisting of rows and columns, each cell containing either alphanumeric text or numeric values. Dan Bricklin founded Software Arts, Inc., and began selling VisiCalc in 1978, the first spreadsheet program he invented and available for personal computers.

1979 Winglets

- Wingtip devices are usually intended to improve the efficiency of fixed-wing aircraft. Throughout the 1970s, NASA aeronautical engineer Richard Whitcomb began investigating and studying the feasibility of winglets in order to improve overall aerodynamics of aircraft. Whitcomb's invention finally culminated with the first successful test flight of his attached winglets on a KC-135 Stratotanker on July 24, 1979.

1979 Inline skates

- Inline skates are a type of roller skate. Inline skates have two, three, four, or five wheels arranged in a single line. Some inline skates, especially those used for recreation, have a "stop" or "brake" which is used to slow down while skating. In 1979, Scott Olson invented inline skates, later receiving a patent for his invention and establishing his company, Rollerblade Inc. in 1983.

1979 Polar fleece

- Polar fleece, or "fleece", is a soft napped insulating synthetic wool fabric made from polyethylene terephthalate or other synthetic fibers. Found in jackets, hoodies, and casual wear, fleece has some of wool's finest qualities but weighs a fraction of the lightest available woolens. The first form of polar fleece was invented in 1979 by Malden Mills, now Polartec LLC., which was a new, light, and strong pile fabric meant to mimic and in some ways surpass wool.

1979 Voicemail

- Voicemail is the managing of telephone messages from a centralized data storing system. Vociemail is stored on hard disk drives, media generally used by computers in order to store other forms of data. Messages are recorded in digitized natural human voice similar to how music is stored on a compact disc. To retrieve and to playback messages, a user calls the system from any phone, and his or her messages can be retrieved immediately. In 1979, Gordon Matthews invented what was then called "Voice Message Exchange," which is the pioneering digital telecommunications system for what is now considered to be voicemail. Matthews filed a patent for voicemail on November 26, 1979, and it was later issued on February 1, 1983. Gordon Matthews holds over thirty-five patents relating to his invention of voicemail.

== The Eighties and the early Nineties (1980–1991) ==
1981 Control-Alt-Delete

- Control-Alt-Delete, often abbreviated as Ctrl-Alt-Del, is a computer keyboard command on PC compatible systems that can be used to reboot a computer, and summon the task manager or operating system. It is invoked by pressing the Delete key while holding the Control and Alt keys: Ctrl+Alt+Delete. Thus, it forces a soft reboot, brings up the task manager (on Windows and BeOS) or a jump to ROM monitor. Control-Alt-Delete was invented in 1981 by David Bradley while working at IBM.

1981 Fetal surgery

- Fetal surgical techniques using animal models were first developed at the University of California, San Francisco in 1980. In 1981, the first human open fetal surgery in the world was performed at University of California, San Francisco under the direction of Dr. Michael Harrison.

1981 Total internal reflection fluorescence microscope

- A total internal reflection fluorescence microscope is a type of microscope with which a thin region of a specimen, usually less than 200 nm, can be observed. It can also be used to observe the fluorescence of a single molecule, making it an important tool of biophysics and quantitative biology. Daniel Axelrod invented the first total internal reflection fluorescence microscope in 1981.

1981 Space shuttle

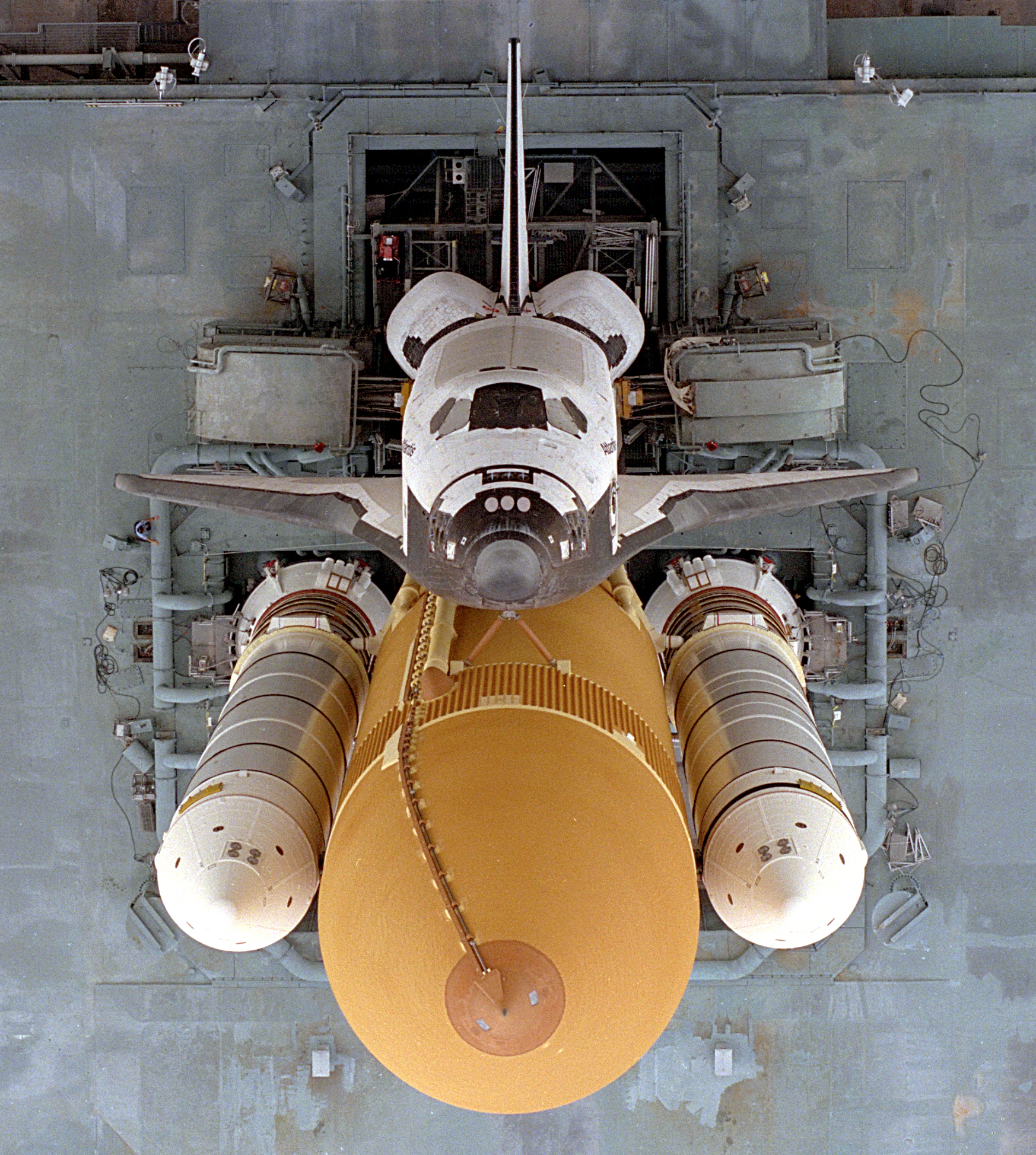
The Space Shuttle: World's most complex machine

The Space Shuttle, part of the Space Transportation System (STS), is a spacecraft operated by NASA for orbital human spaceflight missions. It carries payloads to low Earth orbit, provides crew rotation for the International Space Station (ISS), and performs servicing missions. The orbiter can also recover satellites and other payloads from orbit and return them to Earth. In 1981, NASA successfully launched its reusable spacecraft called the Space Shuttle. George Mueller, an American from St. Louis, Missouri is widely credited for jump starting, designing, and overseeing the Space Shuttle program after the demise of the Apollo program in 1972.

1981 Paintball

Paintball is a game in which players eliminate opponents by hitting them with pellets containing paint usually shot from a carbon dioxide or compressed-gas, HPA or N20, in a powered paintball gun. The idea of the game was first conceived and co-invented in 1976 by Hayes Noel, Bob Gurnsey, and Charles Gaines. However, the game of paintball was not first played until June 27, 1981.

1981 Graphic User Interface

Short for Graphic User Interface, the GUI uses windows, icons, and menus to carry out commands such as opening files, deleting files, moving files, etc. and although many GUI Operating Systems are operated by using a mouse, the keyboard can also be used by using keyboard shortcuts or arrow keys. The GUI was co-invented at Xerox PARC by Alan Kay and Douglas Engelbart in 1981.

1983 Internet

Not to be confused with a separate invention known as the World Wide Web which was invented much later in the early 1990s (see article on the English inventor Tim Berners-Lee), the Internet is the global system of overall interconnected computer networks that use the standardized Internet Protocol Suite (TCP/IP) to serve billions of users worldwide. It is a network of networks that consists of millions of private and public, academic, business, and government networks of local to global scope that are linked by copper wires, fiber-optic cables, wireless connections, and other technologies. The concept of packet switching of a network was first explored by Paul Baran in the early 1960s, thus later invented by Leonard Kleinrock. On October 29, 1969, the world's first electronic computer network, the ARPANET, was established between nodes at Leonard Kleinrock's lab at UCLA and Douglas Engelbart's lab at SRI. In addition, both Bob Kahn and Vinton Cerf are known as the "fathers of the Internet" since they co-invented Internet Protocol and TCP in 1973 while working on ARPANET at the United States Department of Defense. The first TCP/IP-wide area network was operational on January 1, 1983, when the United States' National Science Foundation (NSF) constructed a university network backbone that would later become the NSFNet. This date is held as the birth of the Internet. It was then followed by the opening of the network to commercial interests in 1988.

1983 Blind signature

In cryptography, a blind signature, as invented by David Chaum in 1983, is a form of digital signature in which the content of a message is disguised before it is signed. The resulting blind signature can be publicly verified against the original, unblinded message in the manner of a regular digital signature. Blind signatures are typically employed in privacy-related protocols where the signer and message author are different parties. Examples include cryptographic election systems and digital cash schemes.

1983 Pneumococcal polysaccharide vaccine

Pneumococcal polysaccharide vaccine, also known as Pneumovax, is a vaccine used to prevent Streptococcus pneumoniae infections such as pneumonia and septicaemia. It was developed by American scientists at Merck & Co. in 1983.

1984 Polymerase chain reaction

- The polymerase chain reaction (PCR) is a technique widely used in molecular biology. It derives its name from one of its key components, a DNA polymerase used to amplify a piece of DNA by in vitro enzymatic DNA replication. As PCR progresses, the DNA generated is used as a template for replication. The polymerase chain reaction was invented in 1984 by Kary Mullis.

1986 Stereolithography

- Stereolithography is a common rapid manufacturing and rapid prototyping technology for producing parts with high accuracy and good surface finish by utilizing a vat of liquid UV-curable photopolymer "resin" and a UV laser to build parts a layer at a time. Stereolithography was invented by Chuck Hull in 1986.

1987 Digital Micromirror Device

- The Digital Micromirror Device (DMD) is a silicon chip of up to 2 million hinged microscopic aluminum mirrors all under digital control that tilt thousands of times per second in order to create an image by directing digital pulses through a projection lens and onto a television or movie theatre screen. The Digital Micromirror Device was invented by Dr. Larry Hornbeck while working at Texas Instruments, also holding several patents relating to DMD technology.

1987 Perl

- Perl is a high-level, general-purpose, interpreted, dynamic programming language. It was originally invented by Larry Wall, a linguist working as a systems administrator for NASA, in 1987, as a general purpose Unix scripting language to make report processing easier. Perl is also used for text processing, system administration, web application development, bioinformatics, network programming, applications that require database access, graphics programming etc.

1988 Tilt-and-roll luggage

Airline passengers rolling their luggage in an airport terminal

Tilt-and-roll luggage or wheeled luggage, is a variant of luggage for travelers which typically contains two-fixed wheels on one end and a telescoping handle on the opposite end for vertical movement. Tilt-and-roll luggage is pulled and thus eliminates a traveler from directly carrying his or her luggage. In 1988, Northwest Airlines pilot Robert Plath invented tilt-and-roll luggage as travelers beforehand had to carry suitcases in their hands, toss garment bags over their shoulders, or strap luggage to on metal carts in airport terminals.

1988 Fused deposition modeling

Fused deposition modeling, which is often referred to by its initials FDM, is a type of additive fabrication or technology commonly used within engineering design. FDM works on an "additive" principle by laying down material in layers. Fusion deposition modeling was invented by S. Scott Crump in 1988.

1988 Tcl

Tcl, known as "Tool Command Language", is a scripting language most commonly used for rapid prototyping, scripted applications, GUIs and testing. Tcl is used extensively on embedded systems platforms, both in its full form and in several other small-footprinted versions. Tcl is also used for CGI scripting. Tcl was invented in the spring of 1988 by John Ousterhout while working at the University of California, Berkeley.

1988 Ballistic electron emission microscopy

Ballistic electron emission microscopy or BEEM is a technique for studying ballistic electron transport through variety of materials and material interfaces. BEEM is a three terminal scanning tunneling microscopy (STM) technique that was co-invented in 1988 at the Jet Propulsion Laboratory in Pasadena California by L. Douglas Bell and William Kaiser.

1988 Electron beam ion trap

- The electron beam ion trap is used in physics to denote an electromagnetic bottle that produces and confines highly charged ions. The electron beam ion trap was co-invented by M. Levine and R. Marrs in 1988.

1988 Nicotine patch

- A nicotine patch is a transdermal patch that releases nicotine into the body through the skin. It is usually used as a method to quit smoking. The nicotine patch was invented in 1988 by Murray Jarvik, Jed Rose and Daniel Rose.

1988 Firewall

- A firewall is an integrated collection of security measures designed to prevent unauthorized electronic access to a networked computer system. At AT&T Bell Labs, William R. Cheswick and Steve Bellovin were continuing their research in packet filtering and co-invented a working model for their own company based upon their original first generation architecture of a firewall.

1988 Resin identification code

- The SPI resin identification coding system is a set of symbols placed on plastics to identify the polymer type. The resin identification code was developed by the Society of the Plastics Industry (SPI) in 1988.

1989 ZIP file format

- The ZIP file format is a data compression and file archiver. A ZIP file contains one or more files that have been compressed to reduce file size, or stored as-is. The zip file format was originally invented in 1989 by Phil Katz for PKZIP, and evolved from the previous ARC compression format by Thom Henderson.

1989 Selective laser sintering

- Selective laser sintering is an additive rapid manufacturing technique that uses a high power laser to fuse small particles of plastic, metal, ceramic, or glass powders into a mass representing a desired 3-dimensional object. The laser selectively fuses powdered material by scanning cross-sections generated from a 3-D digital description of the part on the surface of a powder bed. Selective laser sintering was invented and patented by Dr. Carl Deckard at the University of Texas at Austin in 1989.

1989 Magnetic lock

- A magnetic lock is a simple locking device that consists of an electromagnet and armature plate. By attaching the electromagnet to the door frame and the armature plate to the door, a current passing through the electromagnet attracts the armature plate holding the door shut. Receiving a patent on May 2, 1989, the magnetic lock was co-invented by Arthur Geringer, Richard Geringer, and David Geringer.

1990 Optical space telescope

The Hubble Space Telescope

The space shuttle Discovery deployed the Hubble Space Telescope, the world's first optical space telescope, approximately 350 miles (560 km) above the Earth. Although initial flaws limited its capabilities, the Hubble Space Telescope has been responsible for numerous discoveries and advances in the understanding of outer space. From 1946 onward, Lyman Spitzer at NASA was the driving force behind the Hubble Space Telescope and overseeing its design and tying in critical research components. Finally, in 1975, NASA began work on the Hubble Space Telescope which was launched in 1990.

1990 Sulfur lamp

The sulfur lamp is a highly efficient full-spectrumelectrodeless lighting system whose light is generated by sulfur plasma that has been excited by microwave radiation. The sulfur lamp consists of a golf ball-sized (30 mm) fused-quartz bulb containing several milligrams of sulfur powder and argon gas at the end of a thin glass spindle. The bulb is enclosed in a microwave-resonant wire-mesh cage. The technology was conceived by engineer Michael Ury, physicist Charles Wood and their colleagues in 1990. With support from the United States Department of Energy, it was further developed in 1994 by Fusion Lighting of Rockville, Maryland, a spinoff of the Fusion UV division of Fusion Systems Corporation.
