= Timeline of United States inventions =

The following articles cover the timeline of United States inventions:

- Timeline of United States of America inventions (before 1890), before the turn of the century
- Timeline of United States inventions (1890–1945), before World War II
- Timeline of United States inventions (1946–1991), during the Cold War
- Timeline of United States inventions (after 1991), after the dissolution of the Soviet Union
