= Watson capsule =

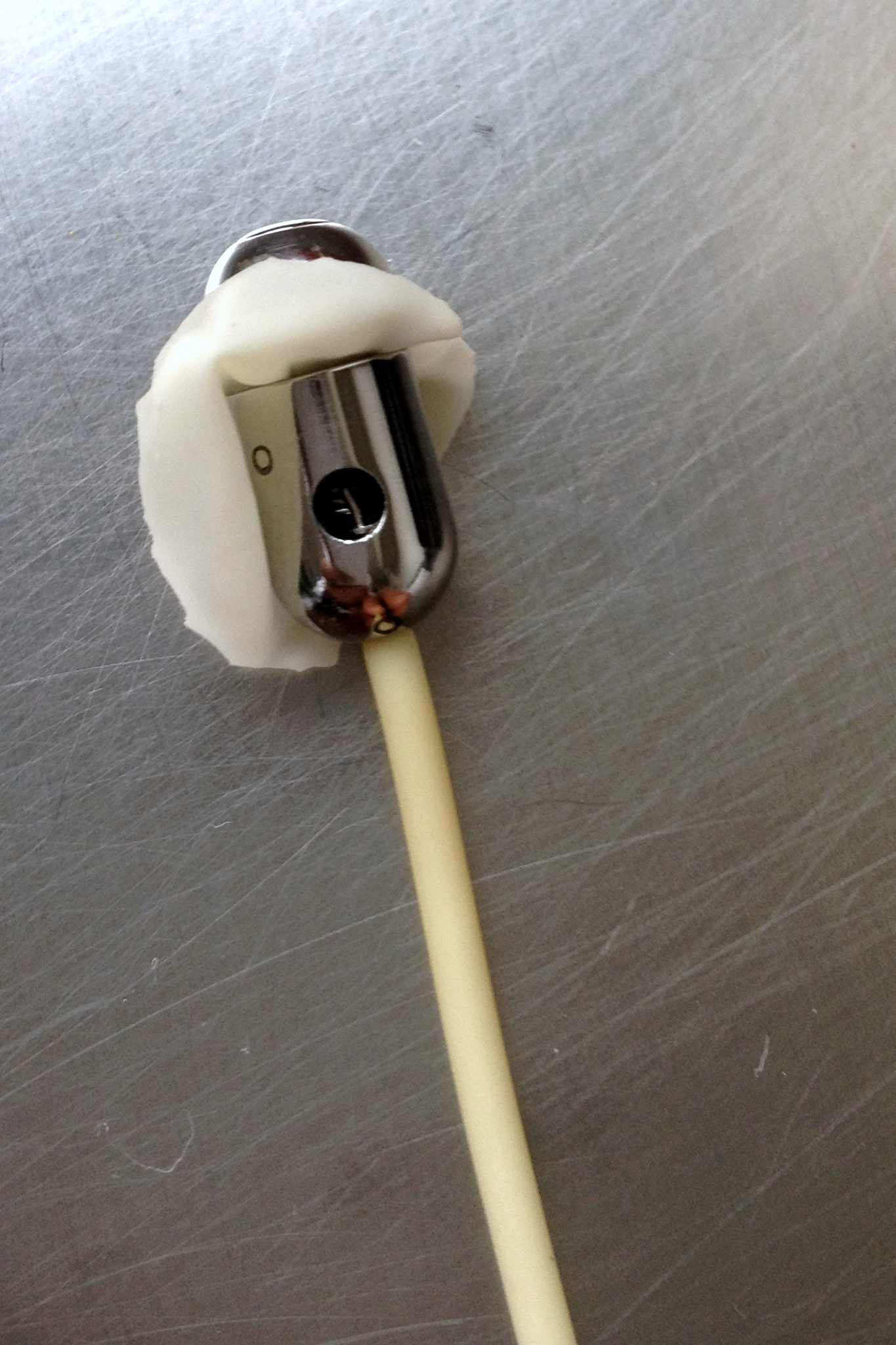

The Watson peroral small intestinal biopsy capsule was a system used through from the 1960s to obtain small intestinal wall biopsies in patients with suspected coeliac disease and other diseases affecting the proximal small bowel.

A similar device known as the Crosby-Kugler capsule was also developed in the 1950s and utilized for similar purposes.
