= William Holmes Crosby Jr. =

American physician (1914–2005)

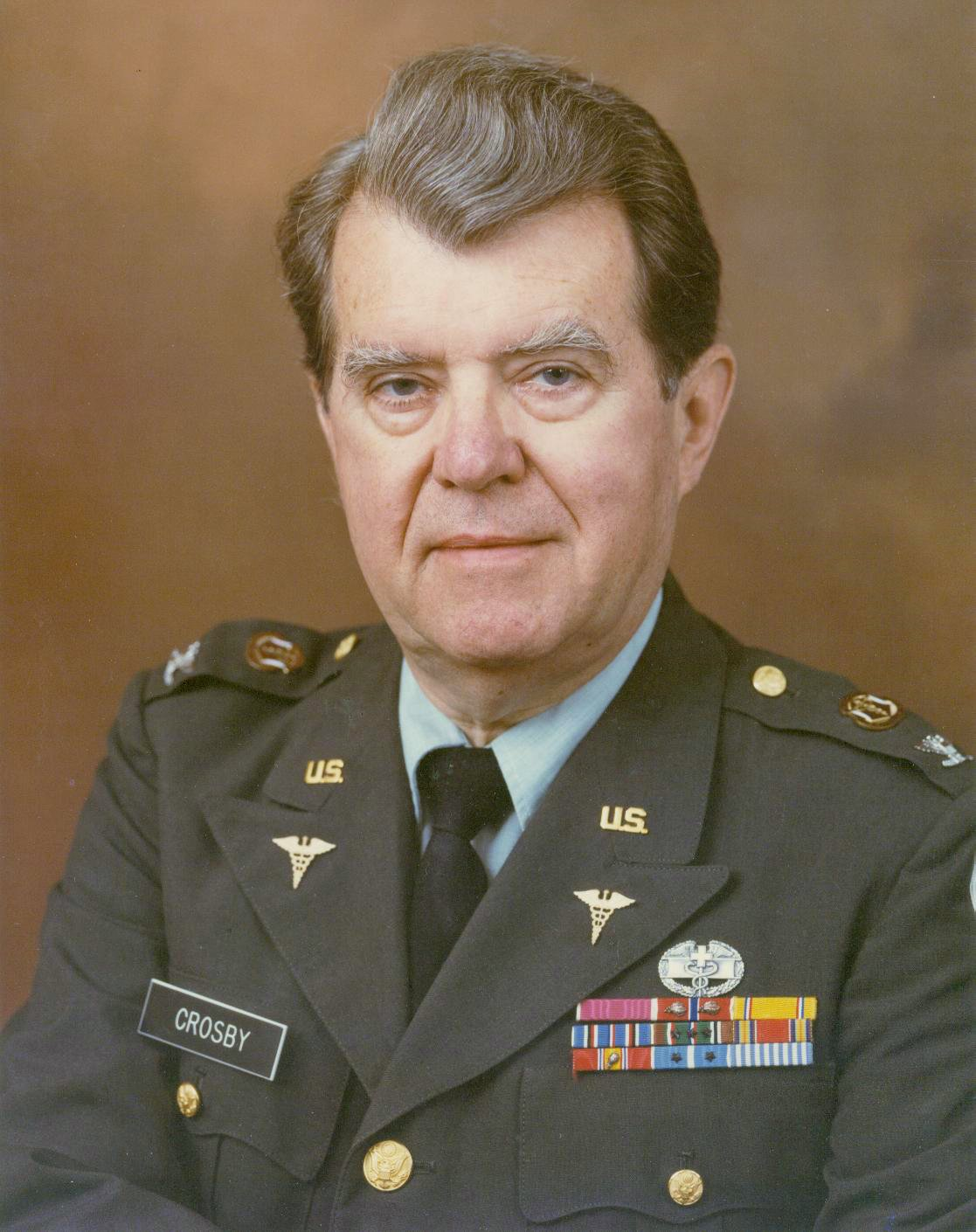
William Holmes Crosby, hematologist, translator

William Holmes Crosby Jr. (December 1, 1914 – January 15, 2005) was an American soldier, translator and physician. He is considered by many to be one of the founding fathers of modern hematology. He published more the 450 peer-reviewed papers in the field, as well as those of oncology, gastroenterology, iron metabolism, nutrition and general medical practice. In addition he was an inventor and published translator of poetry.

== Early life ==
Crosby was born on December 1, 1914, in Wheeling, West Virginia. Six months later, the family moved to Oil City, Pennsylvania. His father was an architect. His mother, Frances Irene Forrester, was a schoolteacher. Crosby was drawn toward medicine at an early age, attaching himself at age 12 to volunteer physicians who worked at the Boy scout camp he attended. In high school he discovered his love of literature from his sophomore English teacher, Dorothy Mann. Crosby attended University of Pennsylvania under a scholarship awarded to him by the Pennsylvania legislature. During this time, he began his life in research as a volunteer in the local hospital hematology lab.

== Soldier and physician ==
In 1936, Crosby entered the University of Pennsylvania School of Medicine. During his third year, he left school to spend six months on his back, recovering from tuberculosis. He graduated in 1940 and enlisted in the army, beginning a military internship at Walter Reed Army Hospital. After the outbreak of World War II, Crosby served two years at as an instructor in the Army's Medical Field Service School at Carlisle Barracks, Pennsylvania. He then requested overseas duty and, in 1942, joined U.S. 85th Infantry Division. During this time Crosby, always seeking a something to study, studied Russian. He would keep vocabulary cards in his helmet. Crosby's battlefield duties resulted in a Bronze Star with an oak leaf cluster. Another cluster was added for his service in Korea.

After the war Crosby returned as an instructor to the Army's Medical Field Service School, now moved to Fort Sam Houston, Texas. From there, he enrolled in an internal medicine residency at Brooke General Hospital where he was put in charge of an over-flow ward. He discovered at that time that there was no hematology support in the state of Texas and thus was forced to engage in an intense self-study course in the field. During a visit by William Dameshek, then a leader in United States hematology, Crosby so impressed Dameshek in his handling of hematologic patients that the latter contacted the then Surgeon General to request that Crosby be formally trained in hematology. Soon after, Crosby was transferred to Pratt Diagnostic Hospital, which later became the New England Medical Center, as a hematology fellow. In 1950 he went on to the Queen Alexandra Military Hospital in London.

Upon his return in 1951, Crosby established both the hematology and oncology specialties at Walter Reed Army Hospital a position he would hold until 1965. It was during this period that he began his long career as medical researcher. He wrote seminal papers in the areas of hematology and iron metabolism. He and his colleagues often served as their own lab rats, voluntarily undergoing such procedures as self-induced iron deficiency anemia, sub-dermal bone transplantation, and consumption of radio-labeled iron.

In the winter of 1952–53, he volunteered to be sent to Korea. There he directed a Mobile Army Surgical Hospital unit. At this time he studied and published on various aspects of blood transfusion following injury. It was also during this period he became aware that some of the soldiers coming through the MASH unit may have suffered from coeliac disease (sprue). In addition he studied methods of blood transfusions and the quality of available blood and concluded that the procedures were safe and effective.

Crosby, c. 1990

Following Korea, he returned to Walter Reed and established a "Sprue Team" in Puerto Rico to study that tropical disease of the small bowel. With his desire to further understand the condition of the intestine, Crosby developed the Crosby Capsule, a biopsy pod which permitted physicians to non-invasively acquire samples of small intestine tissue. The device is still used with young patients. Hereditary nonspherocytic hemolytic anemia or Crosby's syndrome was described by Crosby in 1950. As a hematologist he continued in his research in the metabolism of iron, an essential component of red blood cells. This led to the study of the iron-overload disease hemochromatosis. He maintained a lifelong interest in this disease, battling the FDA for years on the advisability of iron-fortification of wheat products as well as increasing medical awareness of the high incidence of what was, until quite recently, thought to be a rare disease.

In 1965, after more than 25 years of service, he retired from the Army to succeed William Dameshek at Tufts-New England Medical Center in Boston. Seven years later he moved on to Scripps Clinic and Research Foundation in San Diego, Calif., where he established a training program in hematology-oncology. At this time he was awarded the Legion of Merit by the army.

In 1979, he was recalled to active duty by the Secretary of the Army. He served another four years at Walter Reed and retired again into private practice in Joplin, Missouri where he spent the rest of his life, continuing to write papers on a variety of subjects. In 1983, Crosby was invited by the Veterans Administration to become one of 11 professors in its nationwide Distinguished Physicians Program stationed in V.A. Medical Centers throughout the country. He resigned from that post two years later to take up private practice in Joplin, where he would spend his remaining years.

Crosby authored nearly 500 research papers and served on the editorial boards of 12 medical journals and served on the editorial boards of nine medical journals. He is a laureate of the American College of Physicians. He also served on many committees over the years and was a member of numerous medical organizations.

== Translator ==

In 1974, while he was preparing a chapter on the spleen for a textbook on hematology, he included in it his translation of a stanza from Baudelaire's poem Spleen to introduce the word with its original meaning of "the organ of anger and melancholy". He began translating Baudelaire again in 1978 and for the next fourteen years worked on what would become The Flowers of Evil & Paris Spleen. These translations were unique in their maintenance of Baudelaire's original rhythm and rhyme scheme. The collection was published as "Flowers of Evil and Paris Spleen" by Boa Editions in 1991. The publication is augmented by original woodcuts done by Crosby's son, David. Crosby completed a translation of Catullus however this was never published.

== Illustrative papers ==
- Vasoconstrictor action of cocaine. Journal of Pharmacology and Experimental Therapeutics. 1939 65:150-155.
- Crosby's Syndrome, Blood. 1950 Mar;5(3):233-53.
- Paroxysmal nocturnal hemoglobinuria; the mechanism of hemolysis and its relation to the coagulation mechanism. Blood. 1950 Sep;5(9):822-42.
- The hemostatic response to injury; a study of the Korean battle casualty. Annals of Surgery. 1955 Mar;141(3):347-56.
- Intraluminal biopsy of the small intestine; the intestinal biopsy capsule. The American Journal of Digestive Diseases. 1957 May;2(5):236-41.
- Diseases of the reticuloendothelial system and hematology; the red cell and some of its problems. Annual Review of Medicine. 1957;8:151-76.
- Splenectomy in the treatment of hypoplasia of the bone marrow; with a report of twelve cases. Annals of Surgery. 1957 Oct;146(4):637-60
- Treatment of haemochromatosis by energetic phlebotomy; one patient's response to the letting of 55 litres of blood in 11 months. British Journal of Haematology. 1958 Jan;4(1):82-8.
- Effect of homologous bone marrow-spleen cell suspension on survival of swine exposed to radiation from a nuclear weapon. Blood. 1960 Jun;15:856-62.
- The platelet as a sponge: a review. Blood. 1961 Jun;17:767-74.
- Hyposplenism: an inquiry into normal functions of the spleen. Annu Rev Med. 1963;14:349-70
- Intestinal Mucosal Mechanisms Controlling Iron Absorption. Blood. 1963 Oct;22:406-15
- Iron Absorption: The Effect of an Iron-deficient Diet. Science. 1964 May 22;144:1015-6
- Effect of agents simulating the abnormalities of the glucose-6-phosphate dehydrogenase-deficient red cell on Plasmodium berghei malaria. Nature. 1966 Apr 2;210(31):33-5.
- The PubMed list of Crosby's publications
