= Crosby–Kugler capsule =

Device used for obtaining biopsies of small bowel mucosa

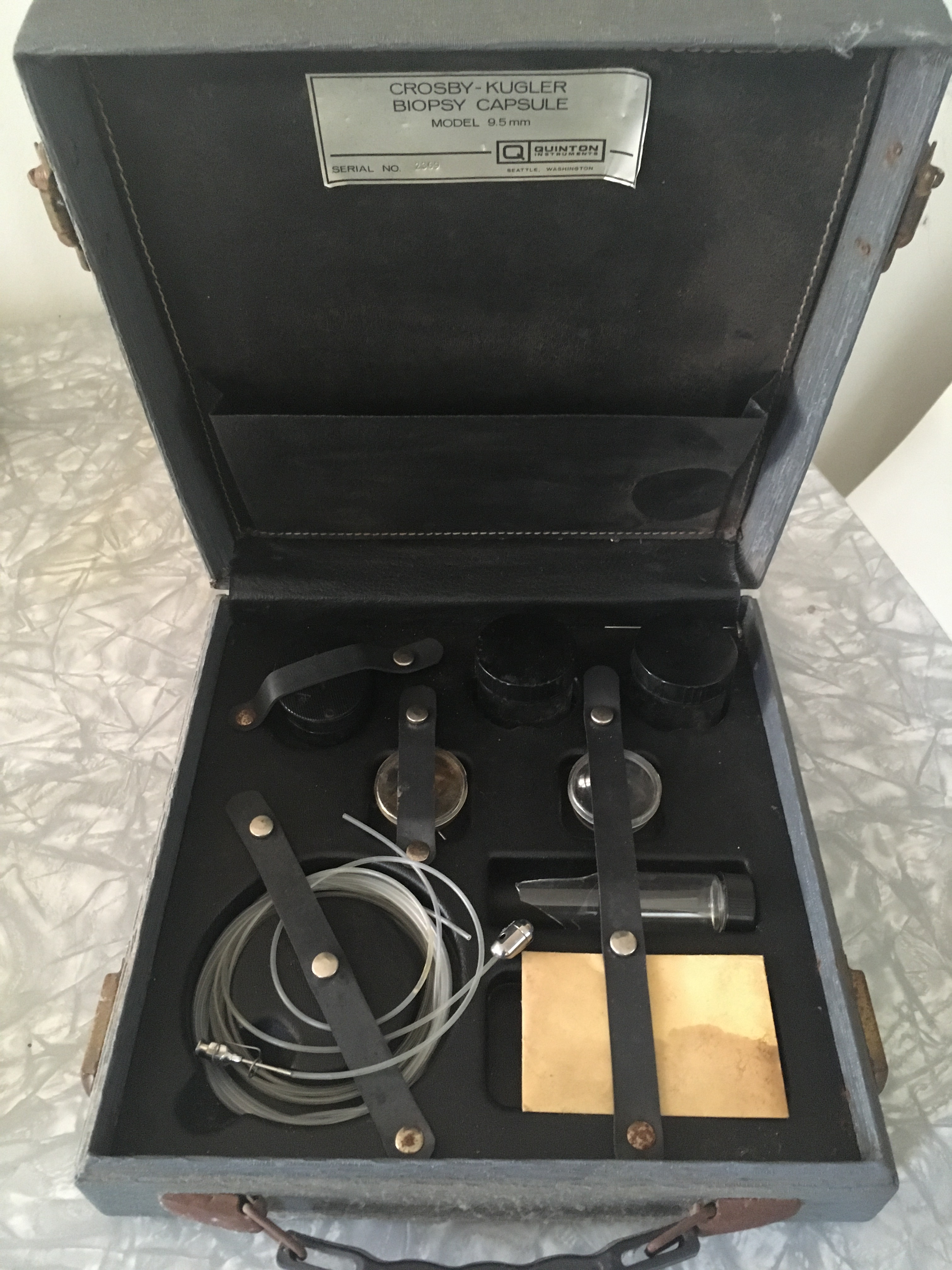
Crosby–Kugler capsule

A Crosby–Kugler capsule, also called a Crosby capsule, is a device used for obtaining biopsies of small bowel mucosa, necessary for the diagnosis of various small bowel diseases. This capsule was originally invented by Dr. William H Crosby to assist in diagnosing Coeliac disease.

The capsule, attached to a long tube, is swallowed. The other end of the tube remains outside the patient's mouth. When the capsule has reached the desired section of bowel, suction is applied to the tube. This suction triggers a mechanism in the capsule which causes a spring-loaded knife to sweep across an aperture in the capsule, cutting away any mucosa protruding into the aperture. The capsule is then pulled up by the tube, and the biopsied tissue is retrieved from within the capsule chamber.

Since about 1980, it has been possible to perform adequate biopsies on adults during an upper endoscopy, relegating the Crosby capsule to use mainly in children.
