= Timeline of United States inventions (before 1890) =

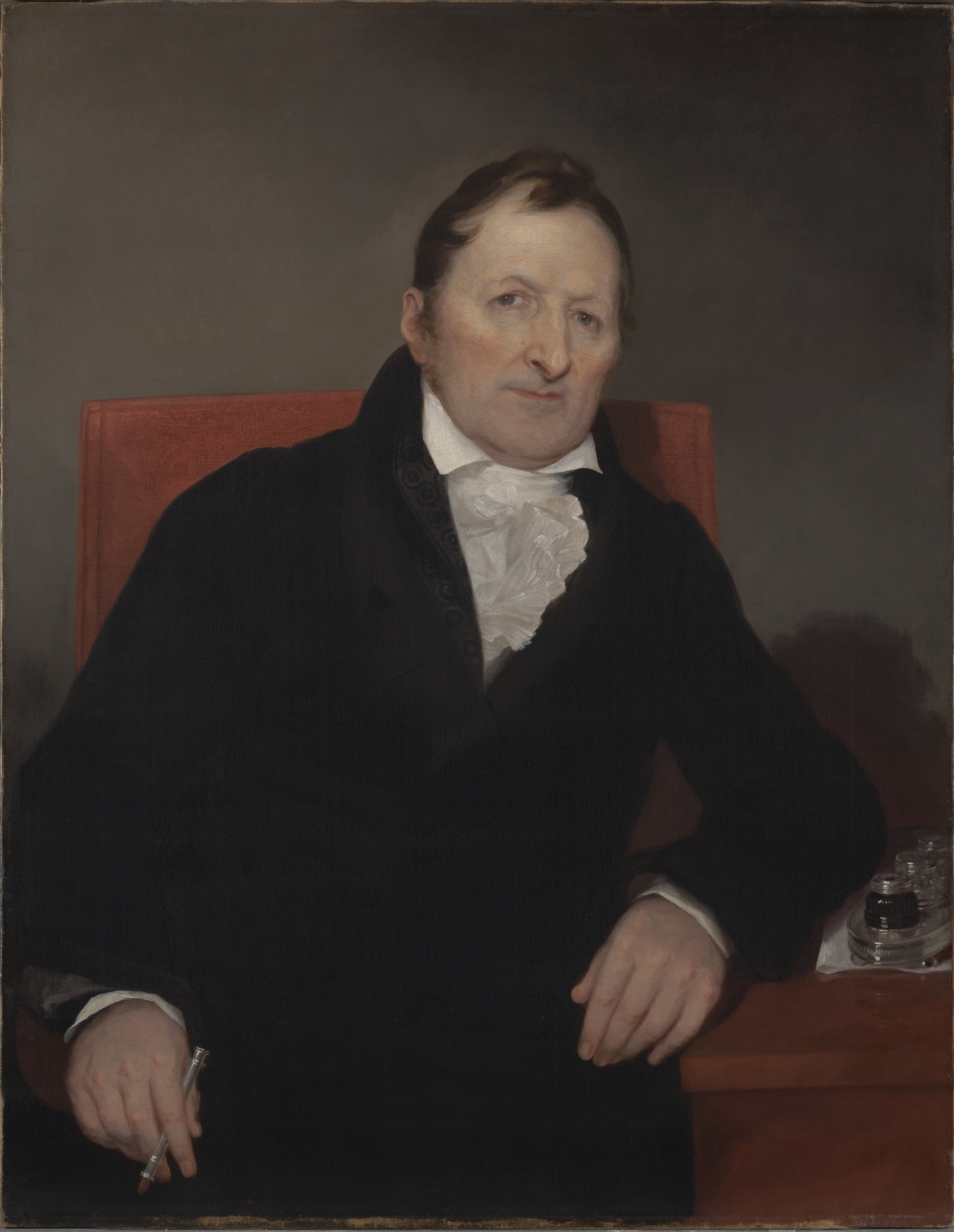
Eli Whitney (1765–1825) is best known for inventing the cotton gin in October 1793 and patenting it on March 14, 1794; a key invention of the Industrial Revolution that shaped the economy of the antebellum South.

The United States provided many inventions in the time from the Colonial Period to the Gilded Age, which were achieved by inventors who were either native-born or naturalized citizens of the United States. Copyright protection secures a person's right to his or her first-to-invent claim of the original invention in question, highlighted in Article I, Section 8, Clause 8 of the United States Constitution, which gives the following enumerated power to the United States Congress:

To promote the Progress of Science and useful Arts, by securing for limited Times to Authors and Inventors the exclusive Right to their respective Writings and Discoveries.

In 1641, the first patent in North America was issued to Samuel Winslow by the General Court of Massachusetts for a new method of making salt. On April 10, 1790, President George Washington signed the Patent Act of 1790 (1 Stat. 109) into law proclaiming that patents were to be authorized for "any useful art, manufacture, engine, machine, or device, or any improvement therein not before known or used". On July 31, 1790, Samuel Hopkins of Pittsford, Vermont became the first person in the United States to file and to be granted a patent for an improved method of "Making Pot and Pearl Ashes". The Patent Act of 1836 (Ch. 357, 5 Stat. 117) further clarified United States patent law to the extent of establishing a patent office where patent applications are filed, processed, and granted, contingent upon the language and scope of the claimant's invention, for a patent term of 14 years with an extension of up to an additional 7 years. However, the Uruguay Round Agreements Act of 1994 (URAA) changed the patent term in the United States to a total of 20 years, effective for patent applications filed on or after June 8, 1995, thus bringing United States patent law further into conformity with international patent law. The modern-day provisions of the law applied to inventions are laid out in Title 35 of the United States Code (Ch. 950, sec. 1, 66 Stat. 792).

From 1836 to 2011, the United States Patent and Trademark Office (USPTO) has granted a total of 7,861,317 patents relating to several well-known inventions appearing throughout the timeline below.

== Colonial Period (1500s–1775) ==
1717 Swim fins

- Swim fins, also known as fins, or flippers, are blade-shaped extensions worn on feet or hands for use in water. They aid movement in aquatic sports such as swimming, surfing, and underwater diving. Swim fins are typically made of rubber or plastic. Benjamin Franklin invented wooden swim fins in 1717. His original design consisted of 10-inch-long (250 mm) and 6-inch-wide (150 mm) palettes. Contrary to today's version of rubberized swim fins worn on the feet, Franklin's swim fins were originally intended for use on a person's hands. Shaped like lily pads or an artist's paint palette, they helped attain greater speed with each stroke. Franklin has since been posthumously honored by being inducted into the International Swimming Hall of Fame.

1730 Octant

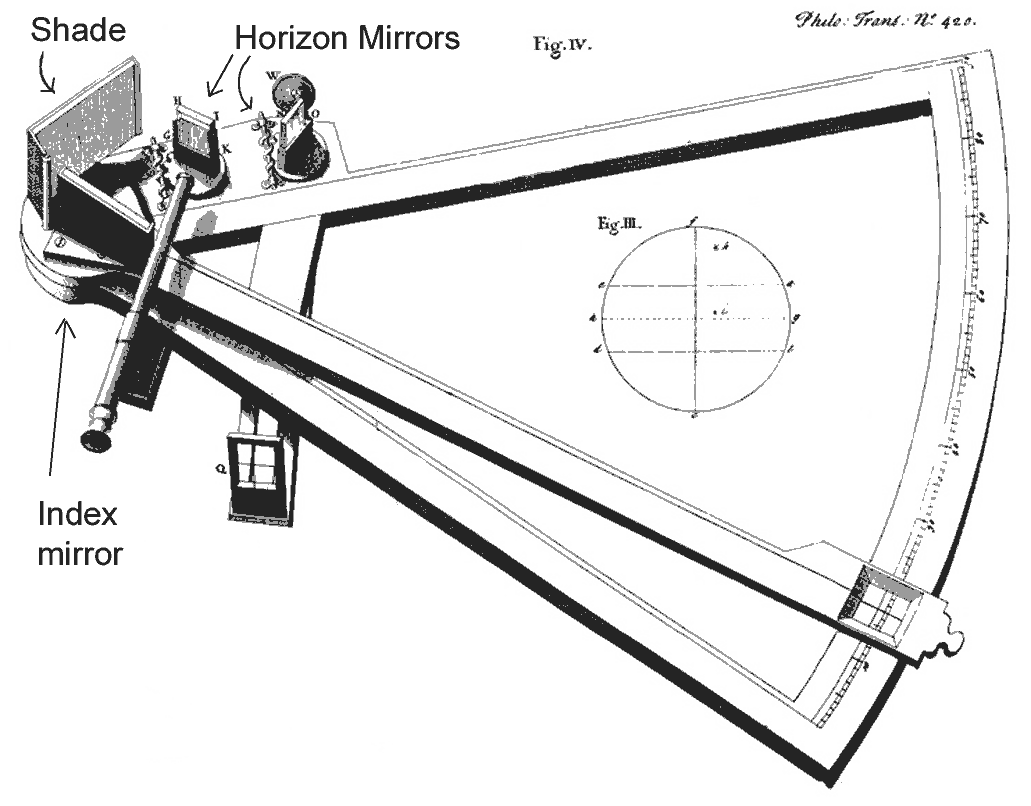
Hadley's octant design

- An octant, also called "reflecting quadrant", is a measuring instrument used primarily in navigation. It is a type of reflecting instrument that uses mirrors to reflect the path of light to the observer and, in doing so, doubles the angle measured. This allows the instrument to use a one-eighth circle arc to measure a quarter circle or quadrant. The octant was invented in 1730 by Thomas Godfrey, a glazier in Philadelphia, and independently at the same time in England by the mathematician John Hadley, who began work on a similar version of the octant. Both men have an equal and legitimate claim to the invention of the octant. Originally this instrument was referred to as "Hadley's quadrant", after the English inventor. These days it is now known as an octant, the name given to it by its American inventor, Thomas Godfrey.

1742 Franklin stove

- The Franklin Stove, also known as the circulating stove, is a metal-lined fireplace with baffles in the rear to improve the airflow, providing more heat and less smoke than an ordinary open fireplace. The stove became very popular throughout the Thirteen Colonies and gradually replaced open fireplaces. The Franklin stove was invented by Benjamin Franklin in 1742.

1744 Mail order

- A mail-order catalog is a publication containing a list of general merchandise from a company. Those who publish and operate mail-order catalogs are referred to as catalogers within the industry, who also buy or manufacture goods and then market those goods to prospective customers. Mail ordering uses the postal system for soliciting and delivering goods. According to The National Mail Order Association, Benjamin Franklin invented and conceptualized mail order cataloging in 1744.

1749 Lightning rod

- A lightning rod is one component in a lightning protection system. In addition to rods placed at regular intervals on the highest portions of a structure, a lightning protection system typically includes a rooftop network of conductors, multiple conductive paths from the roof to the ground, bonding connections to metallic objects within the structure and a grounding network. Individual lightning rods are sometimes called finials, air terminals or strike termination devices. In 1749 or 1750, the pointed lightning rod conductor, also called a "lightning attractor" or "Franklin rod", is generally thought to have been conceived when Benjamin Franklin came to the conclusion that electricity and lightning were identical and of the same. By building lightning rods originally intended to be adorned atop church steeples, Franklin set about trying to prove their usefulness of shielding people and buildings from lightning. By 1752, Dr. Franklin tied the string of his "electrical kite" to an insulating silk ribbon for the knuckles of his hand. The kite in turn was attached to a metal key. During a storm, witnessed by his son William Franklin, Dr. Franklin had finally proven that lightning was a form of electricity when the metal key received an electrical charge from a bolt of lightning. Thus, the practical use of lightning rods, attributed to the inventor Benjamin Franklin, was confirmed.

1752 Flexible urinary catheter

- In medicine, a catheter is a tube that can be inserted into a body cavity, duct, or vessel. Catheters thereby allow drainage, injection of fluids, or access by surgical instruments. Prior to the mid 18th-century, catheters were made of wood or stiffened animal skins which were not conducive to navigating the anatomical curvature of the human urethra. Extending his inventiveness to his family's medical problems, Benjamin Franklin invented the flexible catheter in 1752 when his brother John suffered from bladder stones. Dr. Franklin's flexible catheter was made of metal with segments hinged together in order for a wire enclosed inside to increase rigidity during insertion.

1761 Armonica

- Also known as the glass harmonica or glass armonica, Benjamin Franklin invented a musical instrument in 1761, an arrangement of glasses after seeing water-filled wine glasses played by Edmund Delaval in Cambridge, England. Dr. Franklin, who called his invention the "armonica" after the Italian word for harmony, worked with London glassblower Charles James to build one, and it had its world première in early 1762, played by Marianne Davies. In this version, 37 bowls were mounted horizontally nested on an iron spindle. The whole spindle turned by means of a foot-operated treadle. The sound was produced by touching the rims of the bowls with moistened fingers. Rims were painted different colors according to the pitch of the note.

== Independence and the Federalist Era (1776–1860) ==
1776 Swivel chair

- A swivel or revolving chair is a chair with a single central leg that allows the seat to spin around. Swivel chairs can have wheels on the base allowing the user to glide the chair around their work area without getting up. This type of chair is common in modern offices and is often also referred to as an office chair. Using an English-style Windsor chair which was possibly made and purchased from Francis Trumble or Philadelphia cabinet-maker Benjamin Randolph, Thomas Jefferson invented the swivel chair in 1776. Jefferson heavily modified the Windsor chair and incorporated top and bottom parts connected by a central iron spindle, enabling the top half known as the seat, to swivel on casters of the type used in rope-hung windows. When the Second Continental Congress convened in Philadelphia, Jefferson's swivel chair is purported to be where he drafted the United States Declaration of Independence. Jefferson later had the swivel chair sent to his Virginia plantation, Monticello, where he later built a "writing paddle" onto its side in 1791. Since 1836, the chair has been in the possession of the American Philosophical Society located in Philadelphia.

1782 Flatboat

- A flatboat is a rectangular boat with a flat bottom and square ends generally used for freight and passengers on inland waterways. After serving in the Pennsylvania Line during the American Revolutionary War, Jacob Yoder invented and built a large boat at the Redstone Old Fort on the Monongahela River, which he freighted with flour and carried to New Orleans in May 1782. This was the first attempt to navigate the Ohio and Mississippi rivers for commercial purposes.

1784 Bifocals

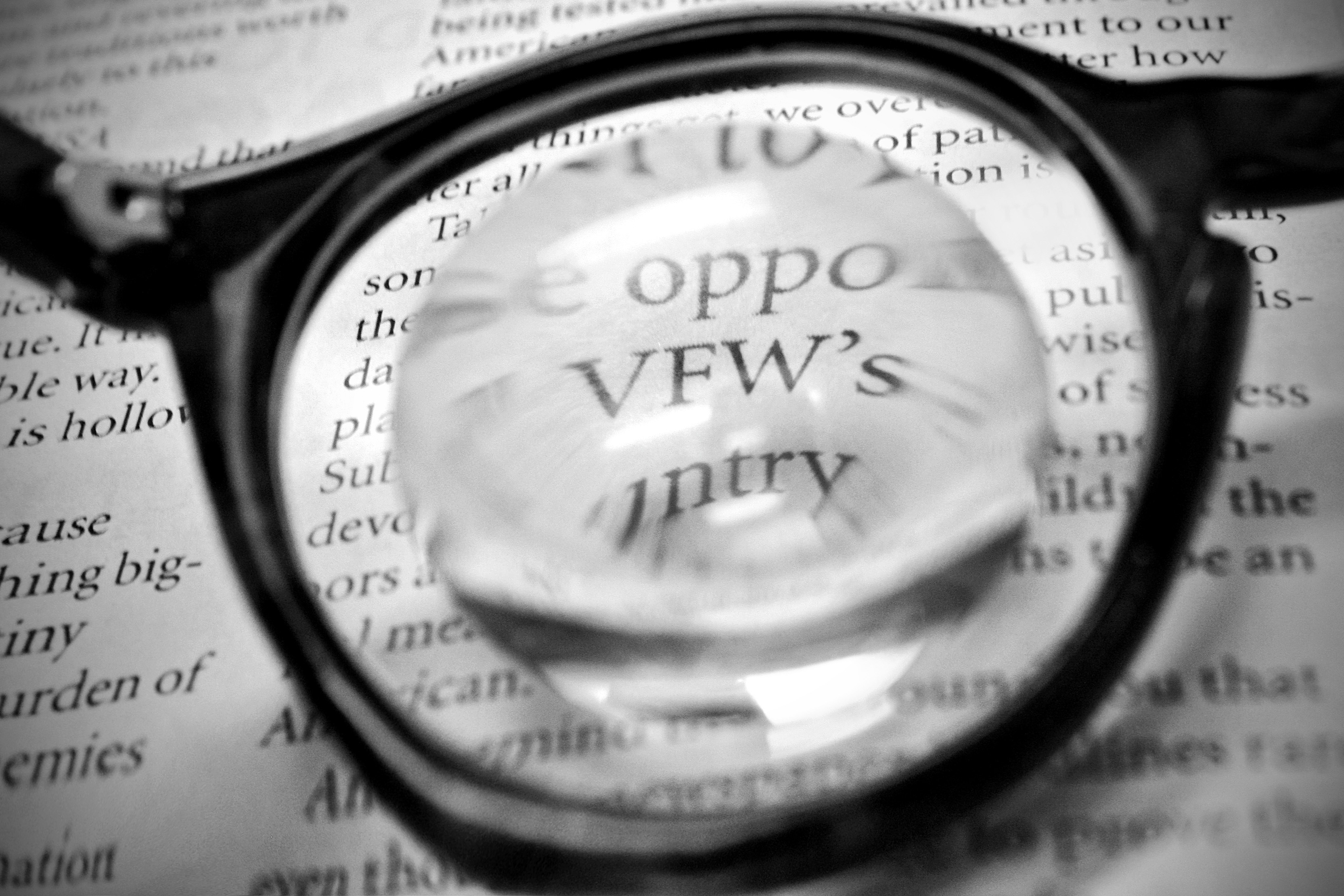
Bifocals can provide a magnification factor of 10x to read text

- Bifocals are eyeglasses whose corrective lenses contain regions with two distinct optical powers. Benjamin Franklin is credited with the invention of the first pair of bifocals in the early 1760s, though according to the Library Company of Philadelphia, the first indication of Dr. Franklin wearing his double spectacles comes from a political cartoon printed in 1784. Many publications from that period onward refer to Dr. Franklin's double spectacles, including his first reference to them in a letter written in Paris, France, on August 21, 1784, that was addressed to his personal friend, English philanthropist George Whatley.

1785 Artificial diffraction grating

- In optics, a diffraction grating is an optical component with a regular pattern, which diffracts light into several beams. The first man-made diffraction grating was invented around 1785 in Philadelphia by David Rittenhouse who strung 50 hairs between two finely threaded screws with an approximate spacing of about 100 lines per inch.

1787 Automatic flour mill

- Classical mill designs were generally powered by water or air. In water-powered mills, a sluice gate opens a channel, starts the water flowing, and a water wheel turning. In 1787, American inventor Oliver Evans revolutionized this labor-intensive process by building the first fully automatic mill using bucket elevators, screw conveyors, and the hopper boy to spread, cool, and dry the meal between grinding and bolting. This was the first time that anyone had conceived and executed a system of continuous, fully automatic production.

1792 Cracker

- A cracker is a type of biscuit that developed from military hardtack and nautical ship biscuits. Crackers are now usually eaten with soup, or topped with cheese, caviar, or other delicacies. The holes in crackers are called "docking" holes as a means to stop air pockets from forming in the cracker while baking. Crackers trace their origin to the year 1792 when John Pearson of Newburyport, Massachusetts invented a cracker-like bread product from just flour and water that he called "pilot bread". An immediate success with sailors because of its shelf life, it also became distinctly known as a hardtack or sea biscuit for long voyages away from home while at sea.

1793 Cotton gin

- The cotton gin is a machine that separates cotton fibers from seedpods and sometimes sticky seeds, a job previously done by hand. These seeds are either used again to grow more cotton or, if badly damaged, disposed of. The cotton gin uses a combination of a wire screen and small wire hooks to pull the cotton through the screen, while brushes continuously remove the loose cotton lint to prevent jams. In 1793, Eli Whitney invented the cotton gin and later received a patent on March 14, 1794. Whitney's cotton gin could have possibly ignited a revolution in the cotton industry and the rise of "King Cotton" as the main cash crop in the South. However, it never made him rich. Instead of buying his machine, farmers built inferior versions of their own which led to the increasing need for African-American slave labor

1795 Wheel cypher

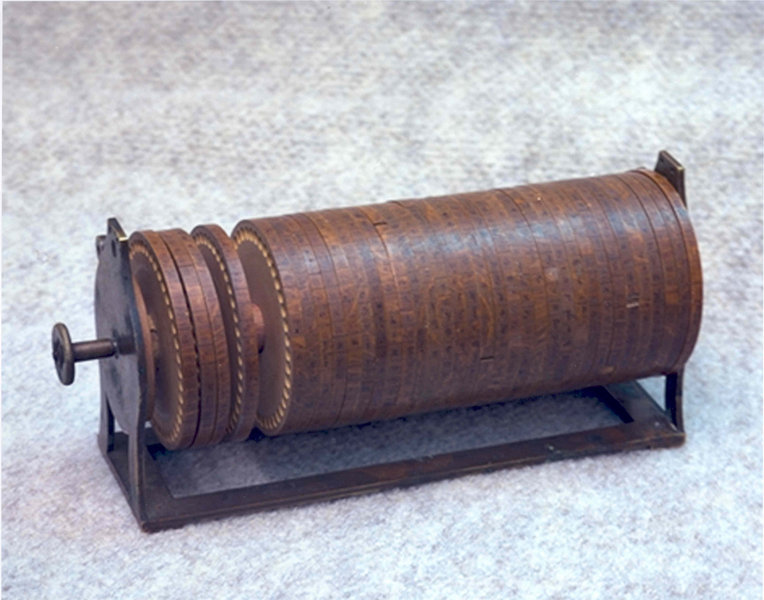
Jefferson's disk

- The Jefferson disk, or wheel cypher, is a cipher system for encrypting messages and used as a deterrent for codebreaking. Using 26 wheels, each with the letters of the alphabet arranged randomly around them, Thomas Jefferson invented the wheel cypher in 1795. Falling in and out of use and obscurity, the wheel cypher was "re-invented" twice: first by a French government official around 1890, and then just prior to World War I by an officer in the United States Army. Designated as M-94, the latter version was used by the United States Army and other military services from 1922 to the beginning of World War II.

1796 Rumford fireplace

- The Rumford fireplace created a sensation in 1796 when Benjamin Thompson Rumford introduced the idea of restricting the chimney opening to increase the updraught. Rumford fireplaces were common from 1796, when Benjamin Rumford first wrote about them, until about 1850. Thomas Jefferson had them built at Monticello, and Henry David Thoreau listed them among the modern conveniences that everyone took for granted. Rumford and his workers changed fireplaces by inserting bricks into the hearth to make the side walls angled and added a choke to the chimney to increase the speed of air going up the flue. It produced a streamlined air flow, reducing turbulence so the smoke would go up into the chimney rather than choking the residents. Rumford fireplaces are appreciated for their tall classic elegance and heating efficiency. This simple alteration in the design of fireplaces were copied everywhere in an age when fires were the principal source of heat. The Rumford fireplace is still used in the 21st century.

1796 Cupcake

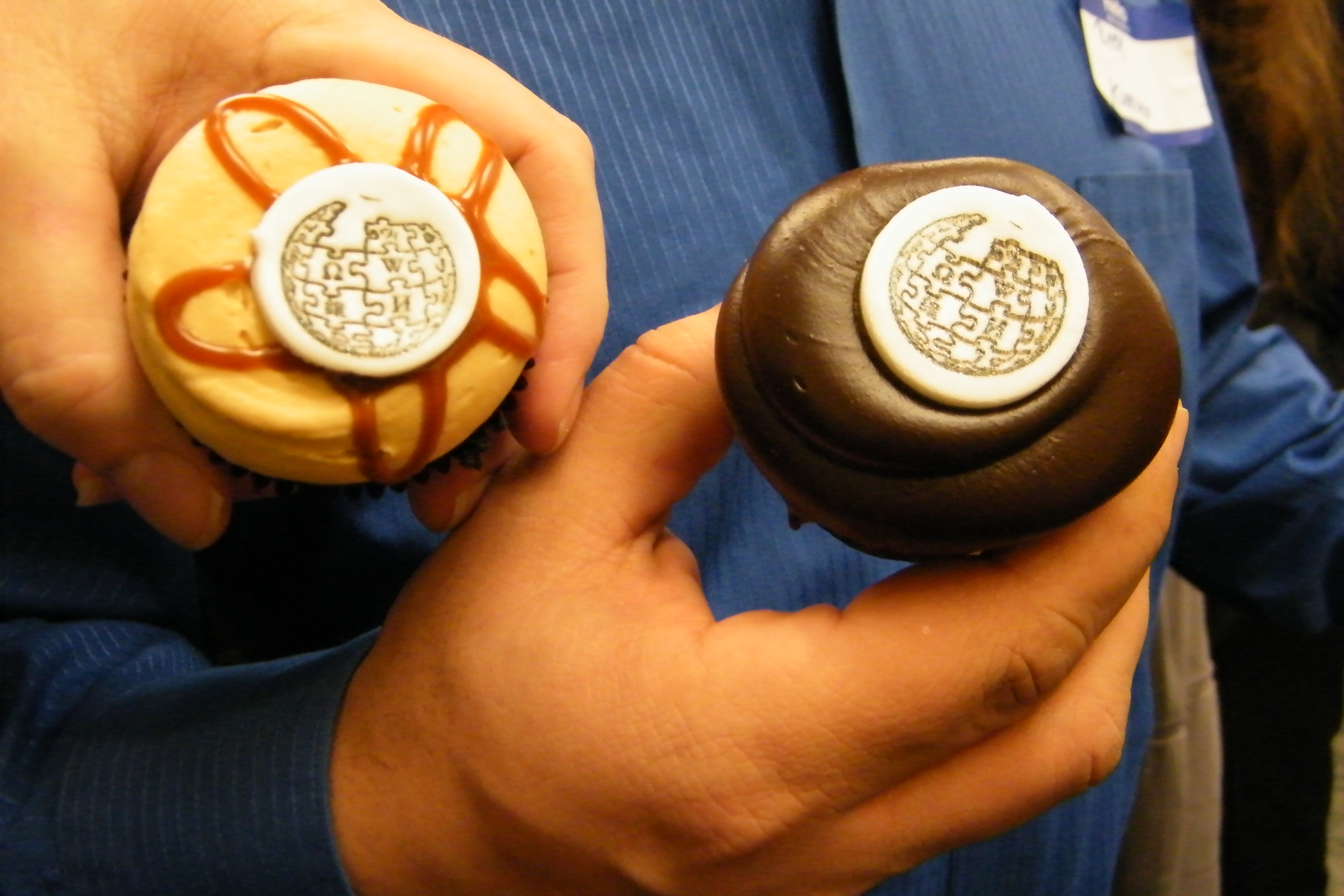
Two cupcakes iced with the Wikipedia logo on their tops

- A cupcake, fairy cake, patty cake or cup cake is a small cake designed to serve one person, frequently baked in a small, thin paper or aluminum cup. As with larger cakes, frosting and other cake decorations, such as sprinkles, are common on cupcakes. The earliest reference of cupcakes can be traced as far back as 1796, when a recipe notation of "a cake to be baked in small cups" was written in American Cookery by Amelia Simms. However, the first use of the term "cupcake" was in Seventy-five Receipts for Pastry, Cakes, and Sweetmeats in 1828 in Eliza Leslie's Receipts cookbook where it referred to the use of a cup for measuring the ingredients.

1801 Suspension bridge

- A suspension bridge is a type of bridge in which the deck, the load-bearing portion, is hung below suspension cables on vertical suspenders that carry the weight of the deck below, upon which traffic crosses. Primitive in their earliest form, the ancestor to what is now considered a suspension bridge, the simple suspension bridge, was developed sometime around 2000 BC in China and India, relying upon ropes thrown across a narrow gorge or river, from which people could hang as they crawled across. With the extreme dangers of swinging back and forth, these simple suspension bridges were deemed impractical as horses as well as carriages later found it difficult to maneuver across their wooden planks. The world's first suspension bridge in a modern sense, the Jacob's Creek Bridge at approximately 70 feet in length, was invented by James Finley of Uniontown, Pennsylvania in 1801, who designed vertical towers to elevate the curved iron cables and to stiffen trusses in order to make the deck of bridges architecturally sound for passing travelers. Nowadays, suspension bridges use steel cables. However, the suspension bridge and its basic, fundamental design of which Finley is duly accredited to inventing, is still evident today in suspension bridges found throughout the world.

1801 Fire hydrant

- A fire hydrant is an active fire protection measure, and a source of water provided in most urban, suburban and rural areas with municipal water service to enable firefighters to tap into the municipal water supply to assist in extinguishing a fire. Before the existence of fire hydrants, a primitive fire suppression system known as "fire plugs" consisted of burying a wooden water pipe (often no more than a hollowed out log) along the streets for teams of bucket brigades to form and fight fires. Wooden pegs would then need to be hammered over fire plugs in order to stop the flow of water. The invention of a post or pillar type fire hydrant is generally credited to Frederick Graff Sr., Chief Engineer of the Philadelphia Water Works around the year 1801. It had a combination hose/faucet outlet and was of "wet barrel" design with the valve in the top. It is said that Graff held the first patent for a fire hydrant, but this cannot be verified due to the fact that the patent office in Washington D.C. was burned to the ground in 1836 where all patent records from that time period were destroyed in the process. In 1863, Birdsill Holly invented the modern version of the fire hydrant. While Holly was only one of many involved in the development of the fire hydrant, innovations he introduced are largely responsible for the fire hydrant taken for granted today. In 1869, Holly was issued U.S. patent #94749, for an "improved fire hydrant".

1802 Banjo clock

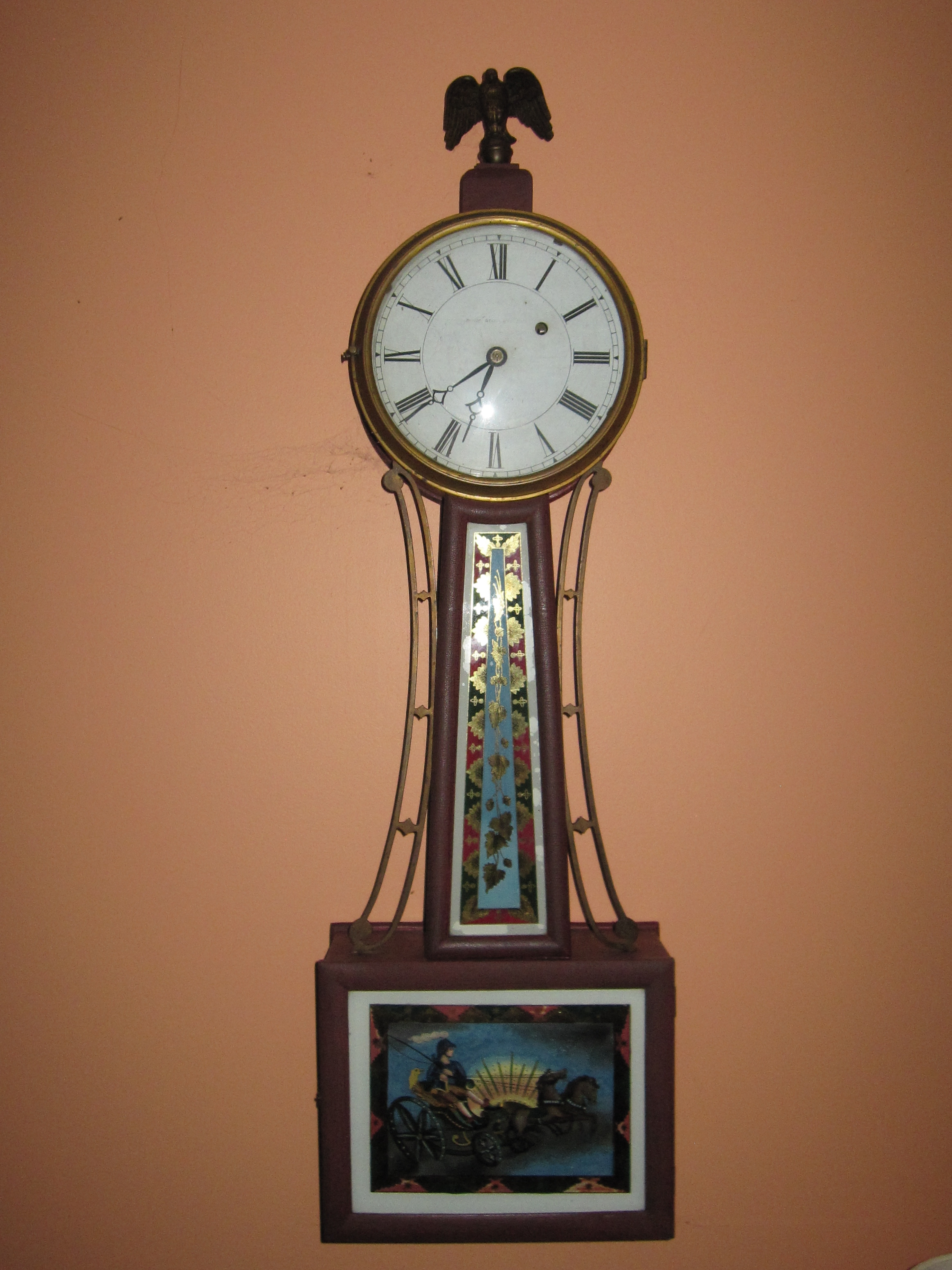
An example of a banjo clock

- A banjo clock is a wall clock with an inverted banjo-shaped case. The banjo clock normally lacks a striking mechanism and indicates time only by its hands and dial, for which reason some horologists may insist upon calling it a timepiece rather than a true clock. The clock is usually adorned with a finial on the top. Known as his "patent timepiece", the banjo clock was invented by renowned American clockmaker Simon Willard of Roxbury, Massachusetts, and patented on February 8, 1802.

1804 Burr Truss

- The Burr Arch Truss, Burr Truss, or the Burr Arch, is a combination of an arch and a multiple kingpost truss design typically implemented in the construction of covered bridges. The design principle behind the Burr arch truss was that the arch should be capable of holding the entire load on the bridge while the truss was used to keep the bridge rigid. In 1804, American architect Theodore Burr, a cousin of then Vice President of the United States, Aaron Burr, designed and built the first Burr Truss on a bridge over the Hudson River in Watertown, New York.

1805 Amphibious vehicle

- An amphibious vehicle is one which can be used on land or water. The self-propelled variant was invented by Oliver Evans who named it the "Orukter Amphibolos". Its steam-powered engine drove either wooden wheels or a paddle wheel used as a means of transport, on land and in water. Evans demonstrated his machine in Philadelphia's Center Square in 1805, built on commission from the Philadelphia Board of Health. Evans' steam engine differed fundamentally from later models, operating at a high pressure, 25 or 30 pounds. Many years later, Evans' invention would be sold off for parts. On July 16, 2005, Philadelphia celebrated the 200th anniversary of Oliver Evans's Orukter Amphibolos. Many historians describe Oliver Evans' invention as the United States' first land and water transporter.

1805 Vapor-compression refrigeration

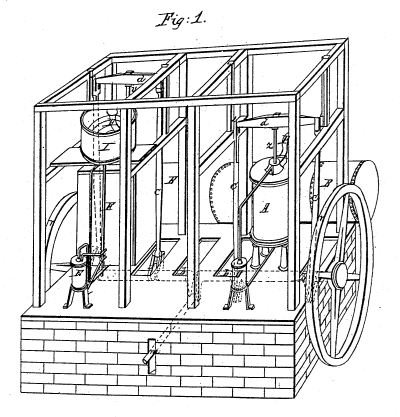
Schematic of Gorrie's 1841 ice machine

- Refrigeration is the process of removing heat from an enclosed space, or from a substance, and moving it to a place where it is unobjectionable. The primary purpose of refrigeration is lowering the temperature of the enclosed space or substance and then maintaining that lower temperature. The American inventor Oliver Evans, acclaimed as the "father of refrigeration", invented the vapor-compression refrigeration machine in 1805. Heat would be removed from the environment by recycling vaporized refrigerant, where it would move through a compressor and condenser, where it would eventually revert to a liquid form in order to repeat the refrigeration process over again. However, no such refrigeration unit was built by Evans. In 1834, Jacob Perkins modified Evans' original design, building the world's first refrigerator and filing the first legal patent for refrigeration using vapor-compression. John Gorrie, an American doctor from Florida, invented the first mechanical refrigeration unit in 1841, based on Evans' original invention to make ice in order to cool the air for yellow fever patients. Gorrie's mechanical refrigeration unit was issued a patent in 1851. American professor Alexander C. Twining of Cleveland, Ohio patented an early vapor-compression refrigerator in 1853 that was fully capable of producing a ton of ice per day. In 1913, refrigerators for home and domestic use were invented by Fred W. Wolf of Fort Wayne, Indiana with models consisting of a unit that was mounted on top of an ice box. A self-contained refrigerator, with a compressor on the bottom of the cabinet was invented by Alfred Mellowes in 1916. Mellowes produced this refrigerator commercially but was bought out by William C. Durant in 1918, who started the Frigidaire Company in order to begin the first mass-production of refrigerators.

1806 Coffee percolator

- A coffee percolator is a type of pot used to brew coffee. In the case of coffee-brewing the solvent is water, the permeable substance is the coffee grounds, and the soluble constituents are the chemical compounds that give coffee its color, taste, and aroma. In 1806, Benjamin Thompson Rumford invented the percolating coffee pot with a metal sieve to strain away the grounds.

1808 Lobster trap

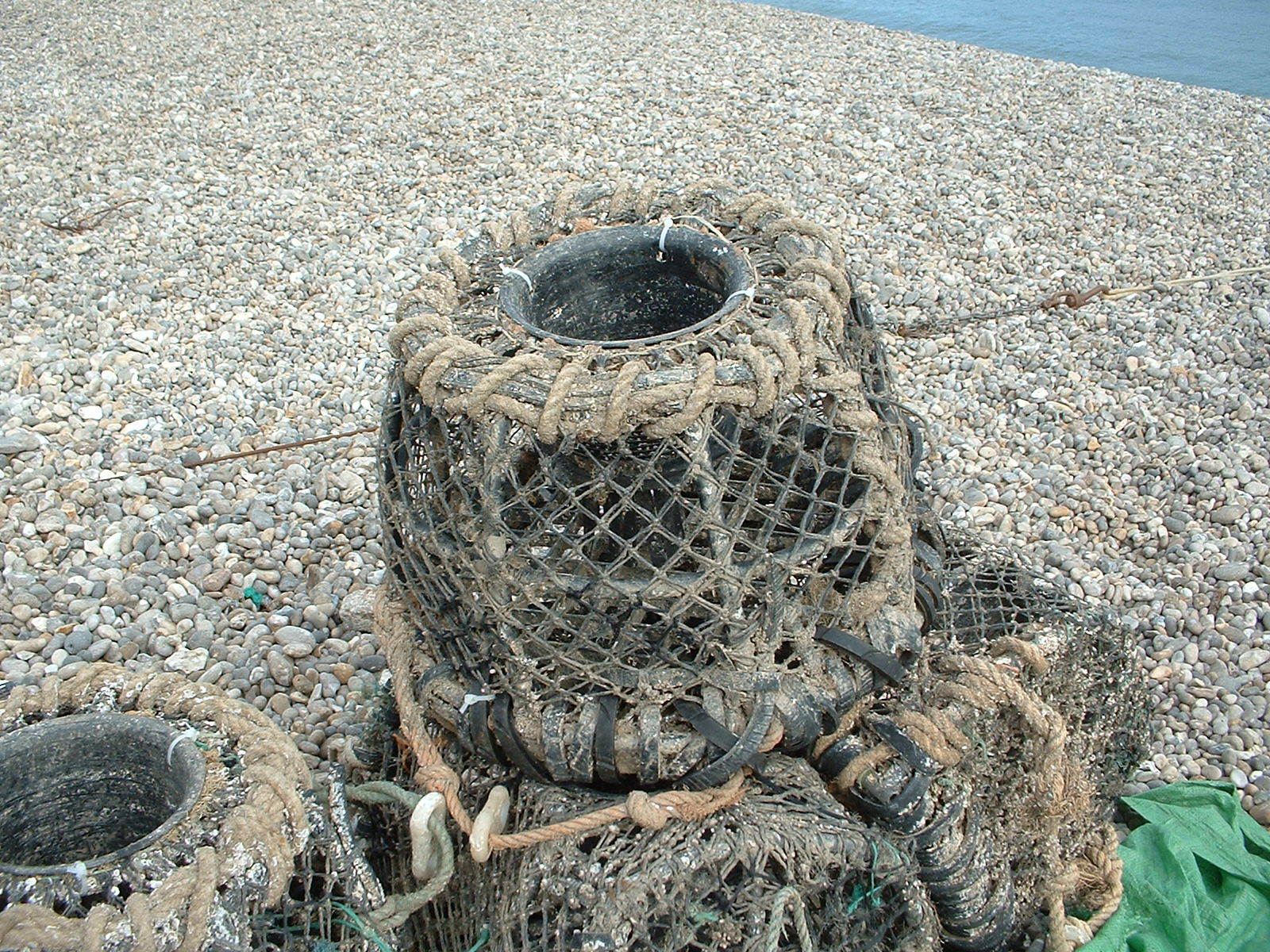
An example of a lobster trap used in Devon, England

- A lobster trap is a portable trap which traps crustaceans such as lobsters or crayfish and is used in the industry of lobster fishing. A lobster trap can catch multiple lobsters at once. The lobster trap was invented in 1808 by Ebenezer Thorndike of Swampscott, Massachusetts.

1812 Columbiad

- The Columbiad was a large caliber, smoothbore, muzzle loading cannon able to fire heavy projectiles at both high and low trajectories. This feature enabled the columbiad to fire solid shot or shell to long ranges, making it an excellent seacoast defense weapon for its day. Used as an artillery piece during the War of 1812 by the United States against the British, the Columbiad was invented around the year 1812 by George Bomford, a colonel in the United States Army.

1813 Circular saw

- The circular saw is a metal disc or blade with saw teeth on the edge as well as the machine that causes the disk to spin. It may cut wood or other materials and may be hand-held or table-mounted. Tabitha Babbitt is credited with inventing the first circular saw used in a saw mill in 1813.

1815 Dental floss

- Dental floss is either a bundle of thin nylon filaments or a plastic ribbon used to remove food and dental plaque from teeth. Levi Spear Parmly, a dentist from New Orleans, is credited with inventing the first form of dental floss. He had been recommending that people should clean their teeth with silk floss since 1815.

1816 Milling machine

- A milling machine is a machine tool used for the shaping of metal and other solid materials. In contrast to drilling, where the drill is moved exclusively along its axis, the milling operation uses movement of the rotating cutter sideways as well as 'in and out'. Simeon North is generally credited for inventing and building the earliest, though primitive, milling machine to replace filing operations by about 1816 or even earlier.

1818 Blanchard lathe

- Thomas Blanchard of Middlebury, Connecticut, invented the Blanchard lathe in 1818, intended for the mass duplication of gun stocks. An earlier copying lathe was built by Andrey Nartov in the early 1700s for creating ornamental pieces Nartov's lathe

1827 Detachable collar

- A detachable collar is a collar separate from the shirt, fastened to the shirt by studs. Hannah Lord Montague invented the detachable collar in Troy, New York, in 1827, after she snipped the collar off one of her husband's shirts to wash it, and then sewed it back on.

1829 Graham cracker

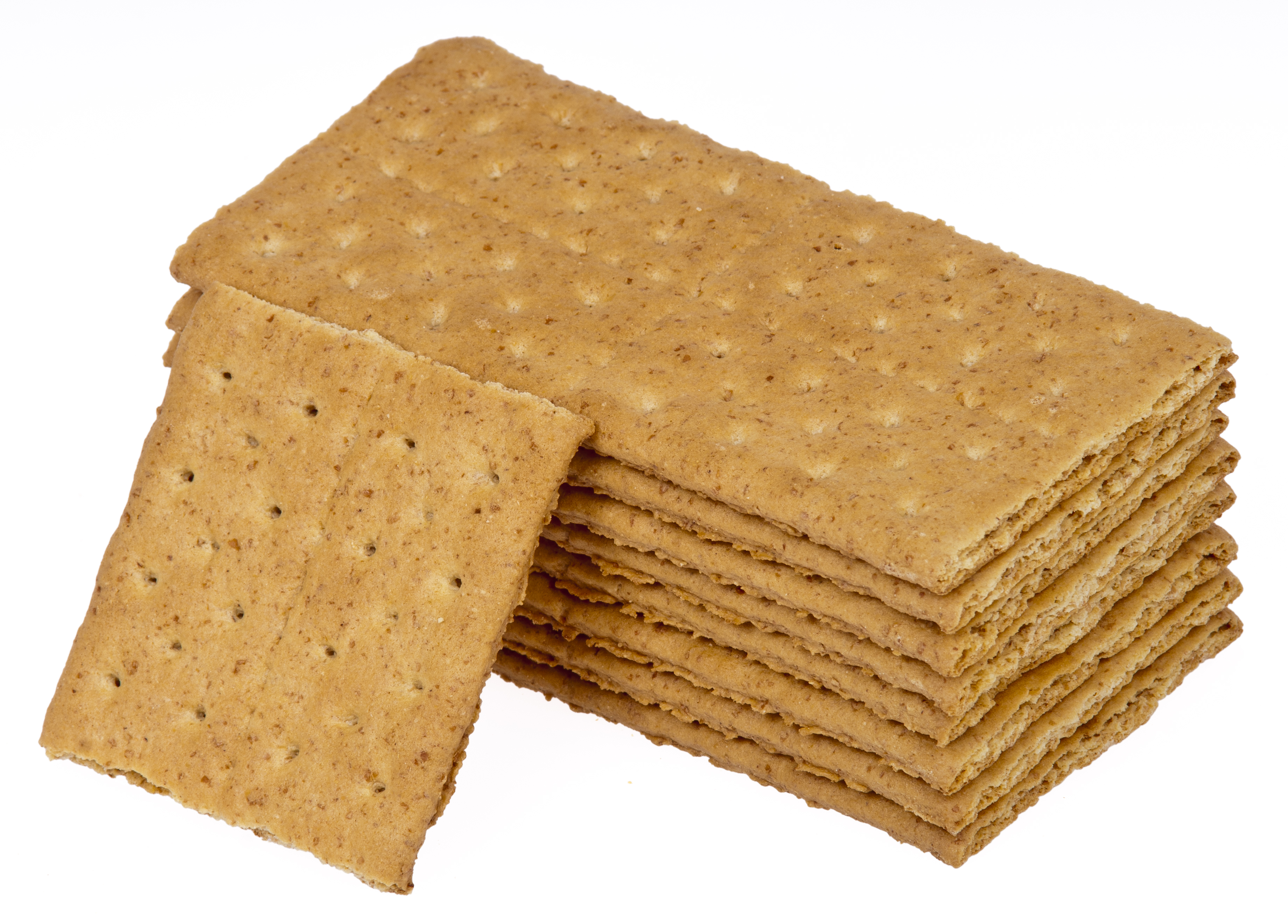
A stack of graham crackers

- A graham cracker is cookie or digestive biscuit made with graham flour, a combination of fine-ground white flour and coarse-ground wheat bran and germ. Graham crackers are often used for making s'mores and pie crusts. Graham bread was invented by a Presbyterian minister, Reverend Sylvester Graham in 1829, for his vegetarian diet. The Graham bread was high in fiber, made with non-sifted whole wheat flour and cut into little squares now known as graham crackers.

1830 Platform scale

- Also known as the Fairbanks Scale, the platform scale is a benched scale for measuring the counterbalance weight of loaded objects at ground level, thus eliminating the use of a hoist. After a series of trial and error in his designs, Thaddeus Fairbanks patented his invention in 1830. E & T Fairbanks & Company, a business partnership between Thaddeus and his brother, Erastus Fairbanks, exported their famous scales around the world to exotic locations such as England, China, Cuba, Russia, and India due to the high demand.

1831 Flanged T rail

- The flanged T rail is an all-iron railway rail that has a flat bottom and requires no chair to hold the rails upright. The flanged "tee" rail was invented in May 1831 by an American named Robert L. Stevens of the Camden & Amboy Railroad and Transportation Company, which he conceived while crossing the Atlantic en route to buy an English locomotive. The first 500 T-rails were installed in Philadelphia. They would go on to be employed by railroads across the United States and are still seen today.

1831 Multiple coil magnet

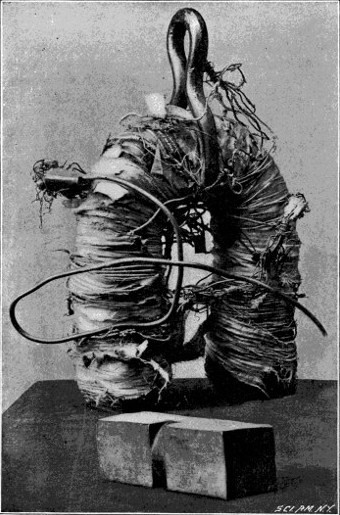
One of Henry's multi-coil magnets

- A multiple coil magnet is an electromagnet that has several coils of wire connected in parallel. This increases the total electric current in the electromagnet and therefore generates a stronger magnetic field. It was invented by American scientist Joseph Henry in 1831.

1831 Doorbell (electric)

- A doorbell is a signaling device commonly found near a door. It commonly emits a ringing sound to alert the occupant of the building to a visitor's presence. The electric doorbell was invented by Joseph Henry in 1831.

1833 Sewing machine (lock-stitch)

- Most modern sewing machines use the lockstitch technique of sewing invented by Walter Hunt, which consists of two threads, an upper and a lower. The upper thread runs from a spool kept on a spindle on top of or next to the machine, through a tension mechanism, a take-up arm, and finally through the hole in the needle. The lower thread is wound onto a bobbin, which is inserted into a case in the lower section of the machine. Walter Hunt invented the first lock-stitch sewing machine in 1833. Hunt lost interest and did not patent his invention. In 1846, Elias Howe secured a patent on an original lock-stitch machine, and failed to manufacture and market it. Isaac Singer infringed on Howe's patent to make his own machine, making him wealthy. Elias Howe filed a lawsuit, alleging patent infringement. On July 1, 1854, a federal commission ruled in favor of Howe, ordering Isaac Singer as well as all sewing machine makers to pay Elias Howe royalties.

1834 Combine harvester

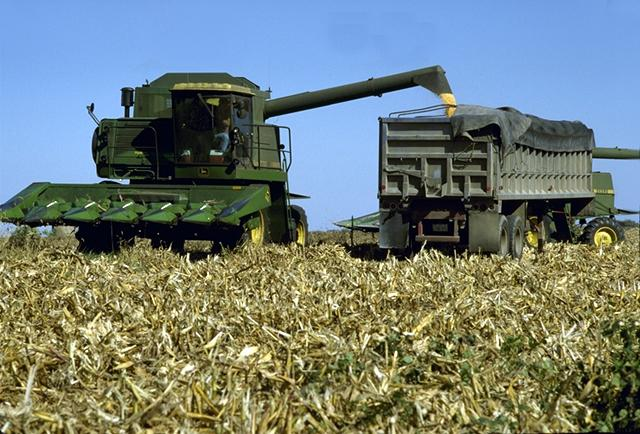
A John Deere combine harvesting corn

- The combine harvester, or combine, or thresher, is a machine that combines the tasks of harvesting, threshing, and cleaning grain crops. The objective is to complete these three processes, which used to be distinct, in one pass of the machine over a particular part of the field. The waste straw left behind on the field is the remaining dried stems and leaves of the crop with limited nutrients which is either chopped or spread on the field, or baled for livestock feed. The first combine harvester was invented by Hiram Moore in 1834.

1835 Steam shovel

- A steam shovel is a large steam-powered excavating machine designed for lifting and moving material such as rock and soil, typically in the mining industry. The steam shovel is composed of a bucket, boom and 'dipper stick', boiler, water tank and coal bunker, a steam engine, and a winch. The steam shovel was invented in 1835 by William Otis, later receiving a patent for his invention on February 24, 1839.

1835 Solar compass

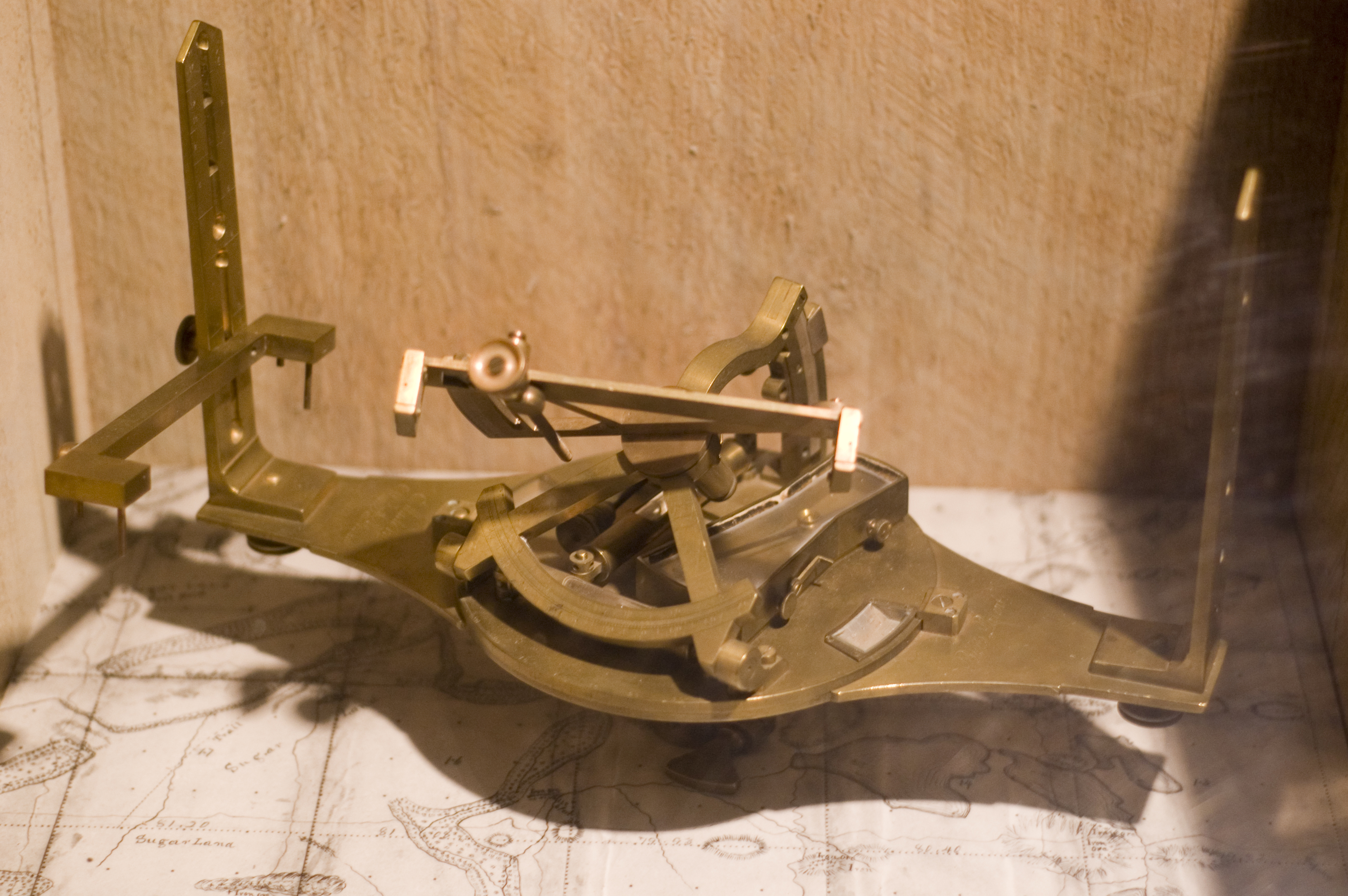
William Austin Burt's solar compass

- A solar compass is a railroad compass with a solar attachment that allows surveyors to determine the north direction by reference to the sun rather than by reference to the magnetic needle. It consists of three arcs: one for setting the latitude of the land to be surveyed; one for setting the declination of the sun; and one for setting the hour of the day. In 1835, the solar compass was invented by William Austin Burt, a U.S. Deputy Surveyor who began surveying government lands in the Michigan Territory earlier in 1833. While experiencing great difficulty in using his standard vernier compass in order to detect deposits of iron ore in the Northwest Territory (present-day Wisconsin), Burt devised the solar compass so that garbled readings of the Earth's magnetic field and north–south survey lines would be easier to find. A patent was issued to Burt on February 25, 1836.

1835 Relay

- A relay is an electrical switch that opens and closes under the control of another electrical circuit. In the original form, the switch is operated by an electromagnet to open or close one or many sets of contacts. The relay was invented by American scientist, Joseph Henry in 1835.

1836 Morse code

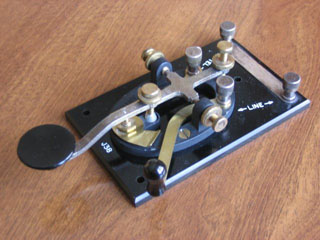
A typical "straight key" model used for transmitting and transcribing Morse code

- Morse code is a type of character encoding that transmits telegraphic information using rhythm. Morse code uses a standardized sequence of short and long elements to represent the letters, numerals, punctuation, and special characters of a given message. After many years of development, an electrical telegraph came to exclusively refer to a signaling telegram, as an operator makes and breaks an electrical contact with a telegraph key, resulting in an audible signal at the other end produced by a telegraph sounder which is interpreted and transcribed by an operator. The short and long elements are formed by sounds, marks, or pulses, in on off keying and are commonly known as "dots" and "dashes" or "dits" and "dahs". In 1832, Alfred Vail in collaboration with Samuel Morse, began the process of co-inventing the Morse code signalling alphabet. After a few minor changes, including the development of International Morse code which is distinct from the original encoding system, American Morse code, Morse code was standardized in 1865 by the International Telegraphy Congress in Paris, France and later made the norm by the International Telecommunication Union. After 160 years of continuous use, international regulations beginning on January 31, 1999, no longer required ships at sea to call for help in an emergency using Morse code or the famous SOS signal.

1836 Gridiron (cooking)

- A gridiron is a metal grate with parallel bars typically used for grilling meat, fish, vegetables, or combinations of such foods. It may also be two such grids, hinged to fold together, to securely hold food while grilling over an open flame. Gridironing is often performed outdoors, using charcoal (real wood or preformed briquettes), wood, or propane gas. The earliest gridiron was a combination hinged gridiron and spider co-invented in 1836 by Amasa and George Sizer of Meriden, Connecticut. U.S. Patent #78 was issued to them jointly on November 14, 1836. The next advancement in the gridiron was a steel wire one was invented and patented in 1889 in New Haven, Connecticut, by William C. Perkins, of the New Haven Wire Goods Company, who received U.S. Patent #408,136 on July 30, 1889, for a hinged gridiron that would hold the meat in place while broiling.

1836 Circuit breaker

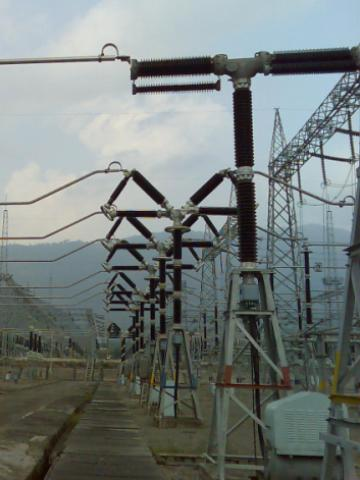
400 kV SF_{6} live tank circuit breakers

- A circuit breaker is an automatically operated electrical switch designed to protect an electrical circuit from damage caused by overload or short circuit. Its basic function is to detect a fault condition and, by interrupting continuity, to immediately discontinue electrical flow. Unlike a fuse, which operates once and then has to be replaced, a circuit breaker can be reset (either manually or automatically) to resume normal operation. Circuit breakers are made in varying sizes, from small devices that protect an individual household appliance up to large switchgear designed to protect high voltage circuits feeding an entire city. Inspired by the works of American scientist Joseph Henry and English scientist Michael Faraday, the circuit breaker was invented by an American, Charles Grafton Page.

1837 Self-polishing cast steel plow

- T he plow is a tool used in farming for initial cultivation of soil in preparation for sowing seed or planting. It has been a basic instrument for most of recorded history, and represents one of the major advances in agriculture. In modern use, a plowed field is typically left to dry out, and is harrowed before planting. An American agricultural pioneer named John Deere modernized the plow by shaping steel from an old sawmill blade and joining it to a wrought iron moldboard. Deere polished both parts smooth so the damp soil would no longer stick. After patenting the device in 1837, it became an instant success and a necessity on American farms.

1839 Corn sheller

- A corn sheller or maize sheller, is a machine used to shell or shuck ears of sweet corn of their silk. By feeding ears of sweet corn into a concentric cylindrical rest, they are parallel to the axis of the shelling cylinder in a hopper fixed on one side of the machine. As the cylindrical rest revolves, an ear falls into each space between staves, and is kept in contact with the shelling cylinder by the pressure of the segment concave. The grain shelled falls beneath the machine and the ear of sweet corn is delivered at the side opposite to the hopper, after having been in contact with the cylinder during approximately four or five revolutions. The corn sheller was invented by Lester E. Denison of Sayville, Connecticut who received a patent on August 12, 1839.

1839 Sleeping car

- The sleeping car or sleeper is a railroad passenger car that can accommodate passengers in beds, primarily to make nighttime travel more restful. The first such cars saw sporadic use on American railroads in the 1830s and could be configured for coach seating during the day. The pioneer of this new mode of traveling transcontinental was the Cumberland Valley Railroad which introduced service of the first sleeping car in the spring of 1939. The sleeping car did not become commercially practical until 1857 when George Pullman invented the Pullman sleeping car.

1839 Vulcanized rubber

- Vulcanization refers to a specific curing process of rubber involving heat and the addition of sulfur or other equivalent curatives. It is a chemical process in which polymer molecules are linked to other polymer molecules by atomic bridges composed of sulfur atoms or carbon-to-carbon bonds. A vast array of products are made with vulcanized rubber including ice hockey pucks, tires, shoe soles, hoses and many more. When "rubber fever" struck Boston in the 1830s, there was a large consumer demand for products made of rubber- aprons, life preservers, hats, carriage tops, and, by 1836, waterproof shoes. But in the heat of summer, rubber goods turned into a gooey, foul-smelling mess; in the winter, they froze stiff. In 1839, Charles Goodyear had a breakthrough when he mixed liquid latex with sulfur and heating it in the sun or over a stove top. The leather-like form of the stretchable substance resulted in the first vulcanized rubber. Goodyear received a patent on June 15, 1844.

1839 Babbitt (metal)

- Babbitt, also called Babbitt metal or bearing metal, is any of several alloys characterized by its resistance to galling. Babbitt is most commonly used as a thin surface layer in a complex, multi-metal structure, but its original use was as a cast-in-place bulk bearing material. Babbitt metal was invented in 1839 for use in steam engines by American goldsmith Isaac Babbitt in Taunton, Massachusetts.

1840 Howe truss

- A Howe truss is a specialized design of a trussed bridge whereby the vertical trusses are in tension and the diagonal trusses are compressed. Howe trusses slope upwards and towards the center of the bridge. The Howe truss was patented in 1840 by William Howe.

1842 Inhalational anaesthetic

- Crawford Long, of Jefferson, Georgia, performed the first operation using his development of ether-based anesthesia, when he removed a tumor from the neck of Mr. James Venable. Long did not reveal the practicality of using ether anesthesia until 1849.

1842 Grain elevator

- Grain elevators are buildings or complexes of buildings for storage and shipment of grain. They were invented in 1842 in Buffalo, New York, by Joseph Dart, who first developed a steam-powered mechanism, called a marine leg, for scooping grain out of the hulls of ships directly into storage silos.

1843 Ice cream maker (hand-cranked)

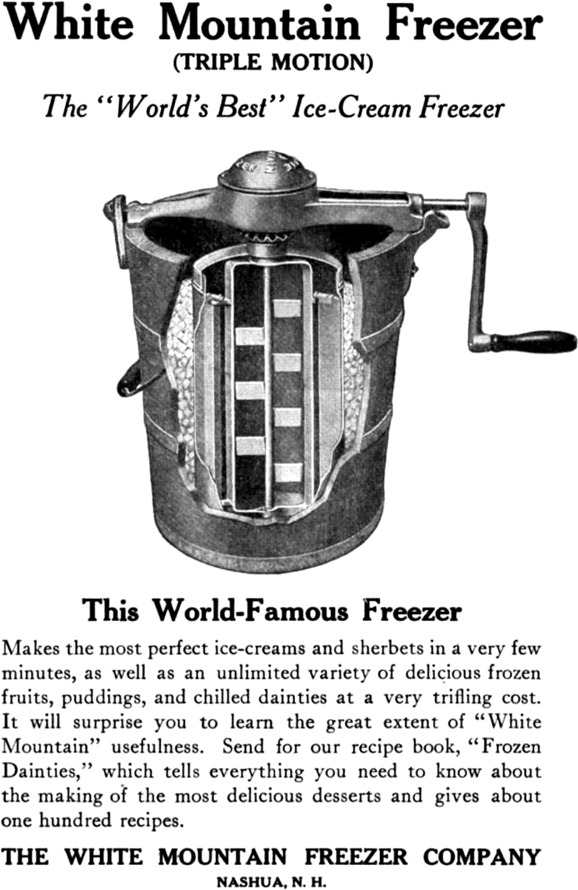
An early example of a hand-cranked ice cream maker

- An ice cream maker is a machine used to make small quantities of ice cream at home. The machine may stir the mixture by hand-cranking or with an electric motor, and may chill the ice cream by using a freezing mixture, by pre-cooling the machine in a freezer, or by the machine itself refrigerating the mixture. An ice cream maker must freeze the mixture, and must simultaneously stir or churn it to prevent the formation of ice crystals and aerate it to produce smooth and creamy ice cream. In 1843, New England housewife Nancy Johnson invented the hand-cranked ice cream churn. She patented her invention but lacked the resources to make and market it herself. Johnson sold the patent for $200 to a Philadelphia kitchen wholesaler who, by 1847, made enough ice cream makers to satisfy the high demand. From 1847 to 1877, more than 70 improvements to ice cream makers were patented.

1843 Multiple-effect evaporator

- A multiple-effect evaporator, as defined in chemical engineering, is an apparatus for efficiently using the heat from steam to evaporate water. In 1843, Norbert Rillieux invented and patented the multiple-effect evaporator where its first installation and use was in a Louisiana sugar factory.

1843 Rotary printing press

- A rotary printing press is a printing press in which the images to be printed are curved around a cylinder. In 1843, Richard Hoe invented a revolution in printing by rolling a cylinder over stationary plates of inked type and using the cylinder to make an impression on paper. This eliminated the need for making impressions directly from the type plates themselves, which were heavy and difficult to maneuver.

1844 Pratt truss

- A Pratt truss is a specialized design of a trussed bridge whereby the vertical trusses are compressed and the diagonal trusses are in tension. Sloping downwards and towards the center of the bridge, Pratt trusses therefore create Y and K-shaped patterns. As the exact opposite of the Howe truss design, the Pratt truss was co-invented and co-patented in 1844 by Thomas and Caleb Pratt.

1845 Pressure-sensitive tape

- Pressure-sensitive tape, PSA tape, adhesive tape, self-stick tape, or sticky tape consists of a pressure-sensitive adhesive coated onto a backing material such as paper, plastic film, cloth, or metal foil. The first pressure-sensitive tape took the form of surgical tape, invented by Dr. Horace Day in 1845.

1845 Maynard tape primer

- The Maynard tape primer is a system designed to allow for more rapid reloading of muskets which previously relied on small copped caps that were filled with mercury fulminate. Dr. Edward Maynard, a dentist with an interest in firearms, embedded tiny pellets of priming material in thin strips of paper, then glued a second strip of paper on top of the first, creating a "tape" of primer. The tape could be manufactured quickly and cheaply, since paper was much less expensive than copper. In 1845, Edward Maynard patented his new firearm invention which in later years, would be widely used in the American Civil War.

1845 Baseball

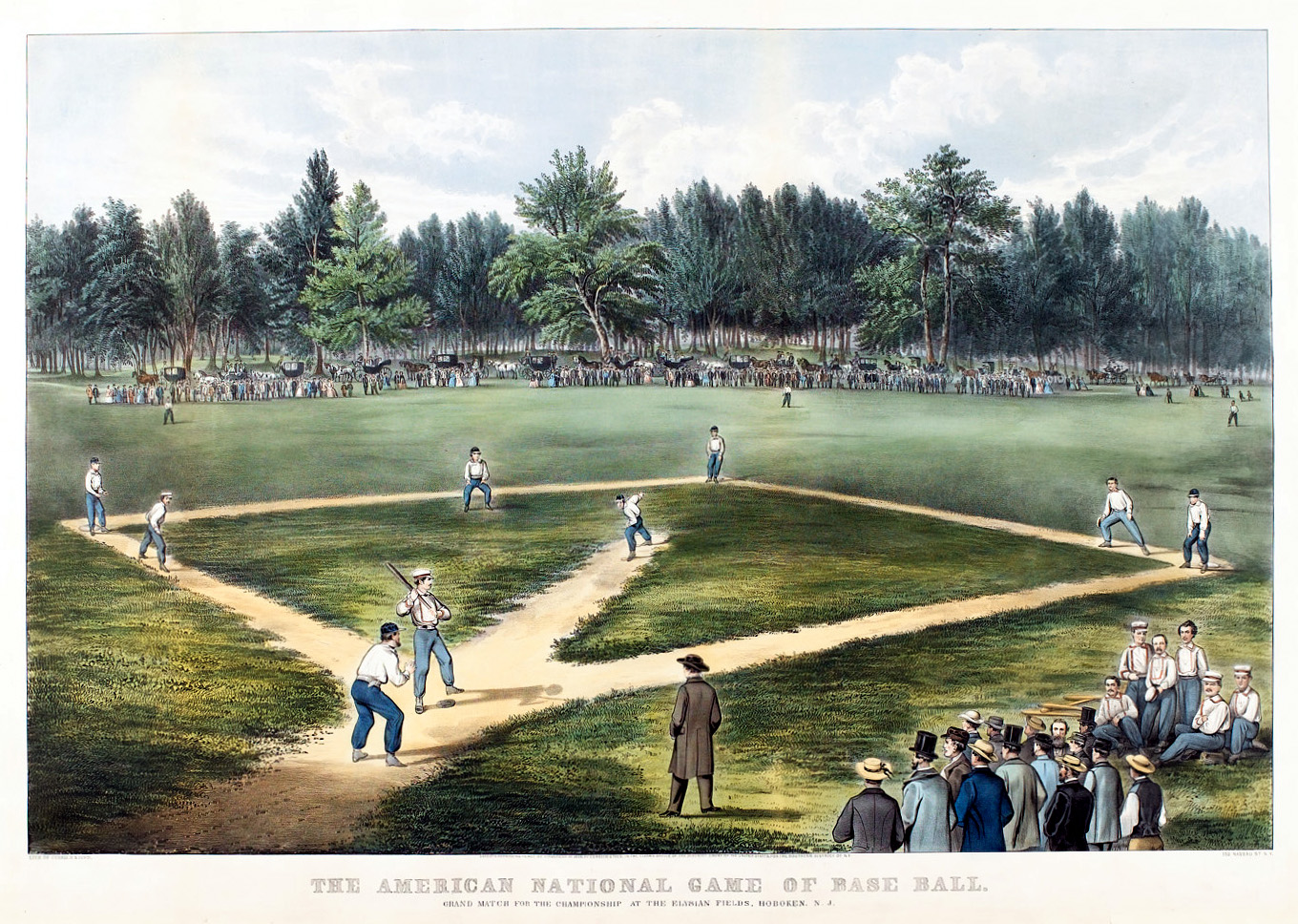
A sketch of an early baseball game played at Elysian Fields, Hoboken, New Jersey

- As the United States' de facto national sport and pastime, baseball is a bat-and-ball sport played between two teams of nine players each. Many historians attribute baseball's origins to the English sports of stoolball and rounders as well as to the 18th and 19th century North American sports of Old Cat and Town ball, all early precursors to baseball. However, the bat-and-ball sports played in the United States, Europe, or elsewhere in the world prior to 1845 did not resemble the standard of modern-day rules as to which baseball has continuously used ever since the mid-19th century. In 1845, Alexander Cartwright wrote the official and codified set of regulated rules of baseball formally known as the Knickerbocker Rules. Cartwright's original 14 rules were somewhat similar to but not identical to rounders. Three exceptions devised by Cartwright included the stipulations that the playing field had to be laid out in a diamond shape rather than a square used in rounders, foul territories were to be introduced for the first time, and the practice of retiring a runner by hitting him with a thrown ball was forbidden. On June 19, 1846, the Knickerbocker Rules were instituted for the first time when Cartwright's New York Knickerbockers competed against the New York Nine, in what is considered by the National Baseball Hall of Fame and Museum in Cooperstown, New York as "the first modern base ball game". With the myth of Abner Doubleday inventing baseball debunked and 46 years after his death, Cartwright in 1938, was inducted into the Baseball Hall of Fame in the executive category. On June 3, 1953, the 83rd United States Congress unanimously credited Cartwright with inventing the modern sport of baseball.

1846 Transverse shuttle

- The transverse shuttle is a method to drive a bobbin on a sewing machine so as to create the lockstitch technique. Transverse shuttles carry the bobbin in a boat-shaped shuttle, and reciprocate the shuttle along a straight horizontal shaft. As the earliest of bobbin drivers, the transverse shuttle was patented by Elias Howe on September 10, 1846.

1846 Printing telegraph

- The printing telegraph is a derivative of the electrical telegraph which links two 28-key piano-style keyboards by electrical wire representing a letter of the alphabet and when pressed causing the corresponding letter to print at the receiving end. The receiver would then receive the instantly readable text of the message on a paper strip. This is in contrast to the electrical telegraphs that used Morse Code 'dots' and 'dashes' which needed to be converted into readable text. After 1850, the printing telegraph was in common use, namely along the United States east coast and in France. The printing telegraph was invented in 1846 by Royal Earl House of Rockland, Vermont.

1847 Gas mask

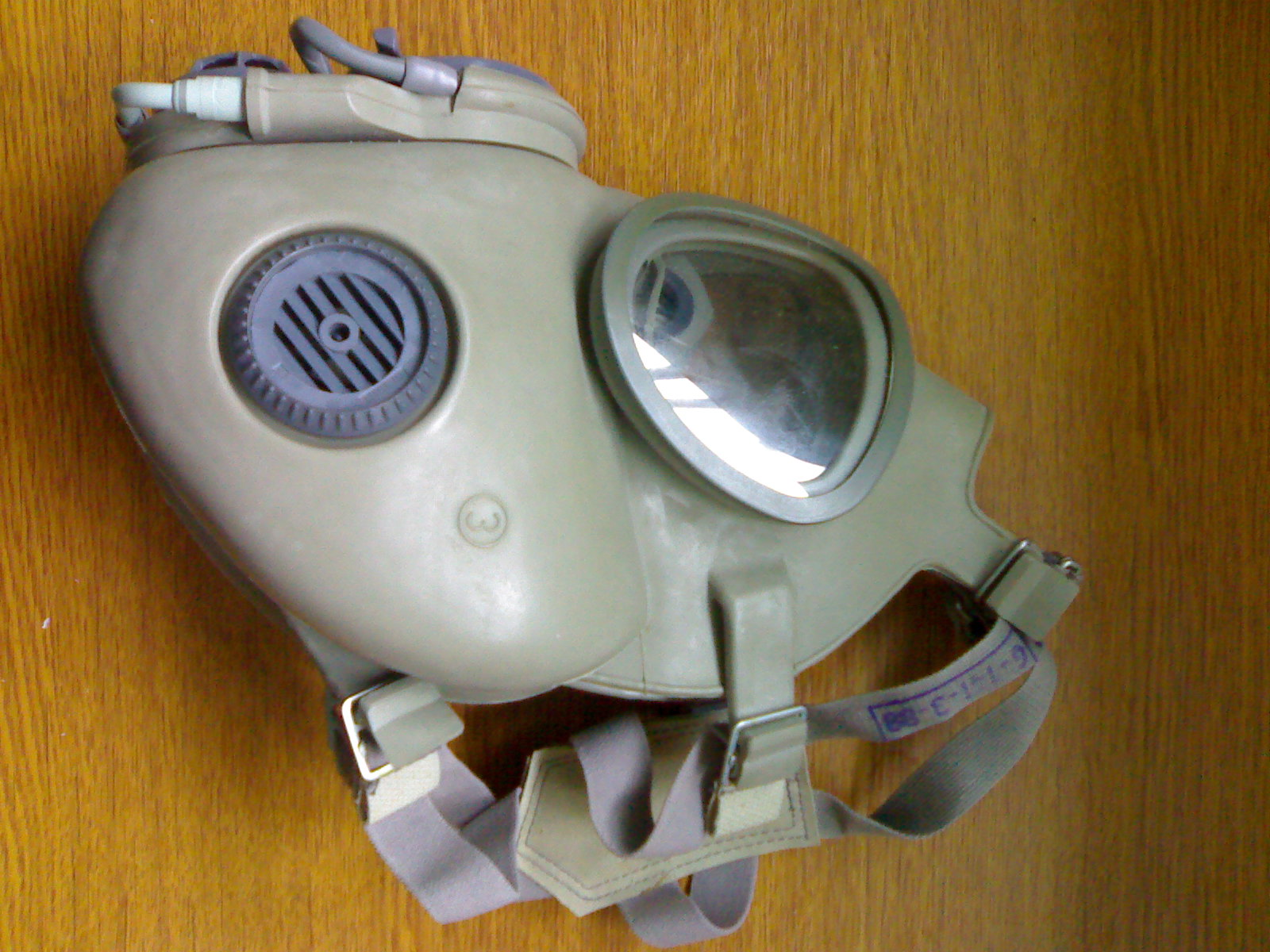
A gas mask from the Czech Republic

- A gas mask is a mask worn over the face to protect the wearer from inhaling "airborne pollutants" and toxic gasses. The mask forms a sealed cover over the nose and mouth, but may also cover the eyes and other vulnerable soft tissues of the face. The gas mask was invented in 1847 by Lewis Haslett, a device that contained elements that allowed breathing through a nose and mouthpiece, inhalation of air through a bulb-shaped filter, and a vent to exhale air back into the atmosphere. According to First Facts, it states that the "gas mask resembling the modern type was patented by Lewis Phectic Haslett of Louisville, Kentucky who received a patent on June 12, 1849". U.S. patent #6,529 issued to Haslett, described the first "Inhaler or Lung Protector" that filtered dust from the air.

1847 Doughnut (ring-shaped)

- A doughnut or donut, is a type of fried dough food popular in many countries and prepared in various forms as a sweet (or occasionally savory) snack that can be homemade or purchased in bakeries, supermarkets, food stalls, and franchised specialty outlets. They are usually sweet, deep-fried from a flour dough, and shaped in rings or flattened spheres that sometimes contain fillings. The doughnut has a long history, supposedly a Dutch creation exported to New Amsterdam (present-day New York City) in the 1600s under the Dutch name of olykoeks—"oily cakes". However, the ring-shaped doughnut with a "hole" in the center is thought to be an American creation, supposedly invented in 1847 by Captain Hanson Gregory of Clam Cove, Maine.

1848 Pin tumbler lock

- The pin tumbler lock is a lock mechanism that uses pins of varying lengths to prevent the lock from opening without the correct key. Pin tumblers are most commonly employed in cylinder locks, but may also be found in tubular or radial locks. The earliest pin-tumble locks were made over 4,000 years ago by the Egyptians. But due to their large, cumbersome size and since they were made of wood, the locks were not practical to use. In 1848, Linus Yale, Sr. invented the modern pin-tumbler lock. In 1861, Linus Yale, Jr. was inspired by the original 1840s cylindrical lock designed by his father, thus inventing and patenting a smaller flat key with serrated edges as well as pins of varying lengths within the lock itself, the same design of the pin-tumbler lock which still remains in use today.

1849 Jackhammer

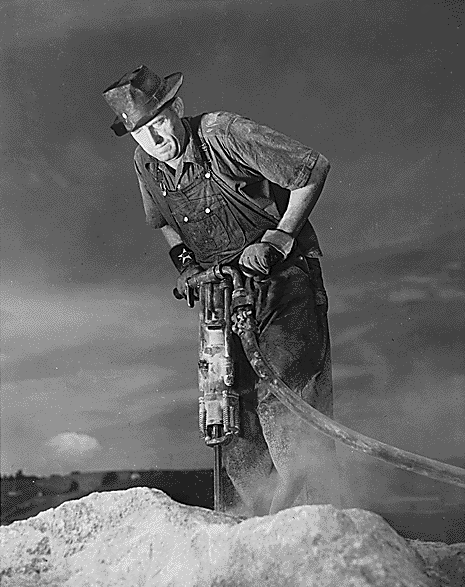
Drilling a blast hole with a jackhammer

- A jackhammer, also known as a pneumatic hammer, is a portable percussive drill powered by compressed air. It is used to drill rock and break up concrete pavement, among other applications. It jabs with its bit, not rotating it. A jackhammer operates by driving an internal hammer up and down. The hammer is first driven down to strike the back of the bit and then back up to return the hammer to the original position to repeat the cycle. The bit usually recovers from the stroke by means of a spring. The earliest form of a jackhammer, a "percussion drill" was invented in 1848 and patented in 1849 by Jonathan J. Couch of Philadelphia, Pennsylvania. In this drill, the drill bit passed through the piston of a steam engine. The piston snagged the drill bit and hurled it against the rock face. It was an experimental model.

1849 Safety pin

- The safety pin is a fastening device, a variation of the regular pin, which includes a simple spring mechanism and a clasp. The clasp serves two purposes, to form a closed loop thereby properly fastening the pin to whatever it is applied to, and to cover the end of the pin to protect the user from the sharp point. The safety pin was invented by Walter Hunt, and patented in April 1849. The rights to the invention were sold for $400.

1850 Dishwasher

- The dishwasher cleans dishes, glassware, and eating utensils. The first dishwasher was a wooden one whereby a person would turn a handle to splash water on the dishware. It was invented in 1850 by Joel Houghton of Ogden, New York. The device was a failure. Houghton received U.S. patent #7,365 on May 14, 1850. The first successful and practical dishwasher was invented in 1886 by Josephine Cochrane. The motorized device turned a wheel while soapy water squirted up and rained down on the dishware. Cochran received U.S. patent #355139 for the "Dish-Washing Machine" on December 28, 1886.

1850 Feed dogs

- Feed dogs are the critical component of a "drop feed" sewing machine. A set of feed dogs typically resembles two or three short, thin metal bars, crosscut with diagonal teeth, which move back and forth in slots in a sewing machine's needle plate. Their purpose is to pull ("feed") the fabric through the machine, in discrete steps, in-between stitches. Allen B. Wilson invented it during the time period 1850 to 1854. U.S. patent #12116 was issued on December 18, 1854.

1850 Vibrating shuttle

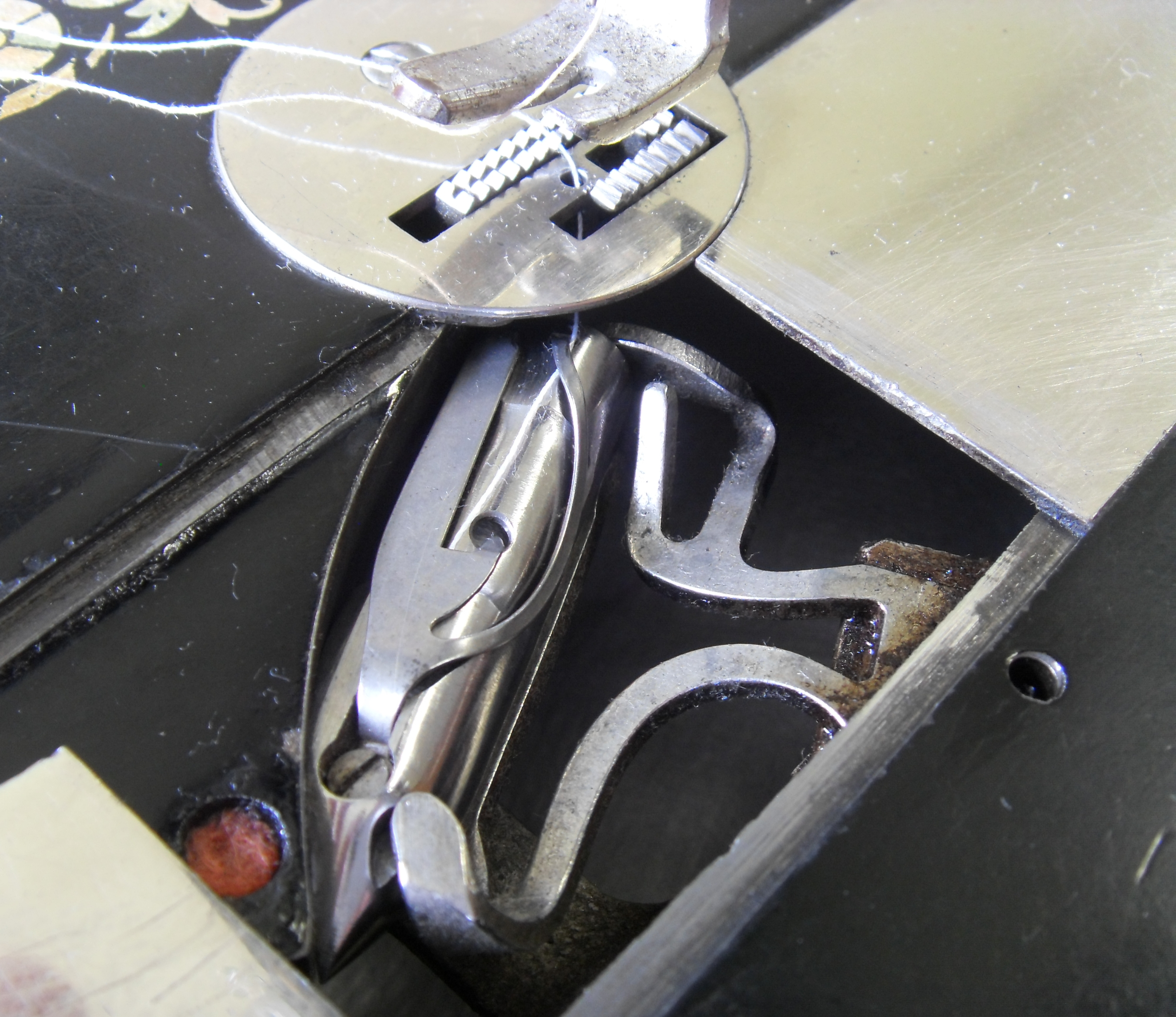
A vibrating shuttle in its carrier

- A vibrating shuttle is a bobbin driver design used in home lockstitch sewing machines during the second half of the 19th century and the first half of the 20th century. It supplanted the earlier transverse shuttle design invented by Elias Howe in 1846, but was itself supplanted by the rotary hook later on. American cabinetmaker Allen B. Wilson of Willet, New York invented the vibrating shuttle design in 1850. The owners of the 1848 Bradshaw patent claimed infringement by Wilson. However, it was without justification. In order to avoid a lawsuit, Wilson relinquished his interest in U.S. Patent #7,776 that was issued to him on November 12, 1850. A.P. Kline and Edward Lee took ownership.

1850 Inverted microscope

- An inverted microscope is a microscope with its light source and condenser on the top, above the stage pointing down, while the objectives and turret are below the stage pointing up. The inverted microscope was invented in 1850 by J. Lawrence Smith, a faculty member of Tulane University and the Medical College of Louisiana.

1851 Rotary hook

- A rotary hook is a Bobbin driver design used in lockstitch sewing machines of the 19th and 20th century and beyond. It triumphed over competing designs because it could run at higher speeds with less vibration. Rotary hook machines hold their bobbin stationary, and continuously rotate the thread hook around it. The rotary hook was co-invented by American cabinetmaker Allen B. Wilson and Nathaniel Wheeler in 1851. U.S. Patent # 8,296 was issued to Wilson on August 12, 1851.

1851 Fire alarm box

- A fire alarm box is an outdoor device used for notifying a fire department of a fire. Early boxes used the telegraph system and were the main method of calling the fire department to a neighborhood in the days before people had telephones. When the box is triggered, a spring-loaded wheel spins and taps out a signal onto the fire alarm telegraph wire, indicating the box number. The receiver at a fire station then can match the number to the neighborhood. The municipal fire alarm system got its start in Massachusetts. It was invented by Moses G. Farmer, an engineer, and Dr. William Channing, a Harvard-educated Bostonian. Their revolutionary creation was installed in 1851 and consisted of 40 miles of wire and 45 boxes in Boston.

1852 Elevator brake

- An elevator or lift is a vertical transport vehicle that efficiently moves people or goods between floors of a building. In 1852, Elisha Graves Otis invented the first safety brake for elevators which prevents an elevator from spiralling into a free fall between numerous floors inside a building.

1853 Burglar alarm

- A burglar alarm contains sensors which are connected to a control unit via a low-voltage hardwire or narrowband RF signal which is used to interact with a response device. The alarm was patented (U.S. patent #9,802) on June 21, 1853, by the Reverend Augustus Russell Pope of Somerville, Massachusetts. As the first person to commercialize Pope's invention, Edwin Holmes acquired Pope's patent rights in 1857 for US$1,500.

1853 Potato chips

- Potato chips, also known as crisps in British English, are thin slices of potato that are deep fried or baked until crispy. Potato chips serve as an appetizer, side dish, or snack. The basic chips are cooked and salted, and additional varieties are manufactured using various flavorings and ingredients including seasonings, herbs, spices, cheeses, and artificial additives. The original potato chip recipe was invented by chef George Crum at Moon's Lake House near Saratoga Springs, New York, on August 24, 1853. Fed up with a customer who continued to send his fried potatoes back complaining that they were too thick and soggy, Crum decided to slice the potatoes so thin that they could not be eaten with a fork. As they could not be fried normally in a pan, he decided to stir-fry the potato slices. Against Crum's expectation, the guest was ecstatic about the new chips and they soon became a regular item on the lodge's menu, and were known as "Saratoga chips".

1853 spring Clothespin

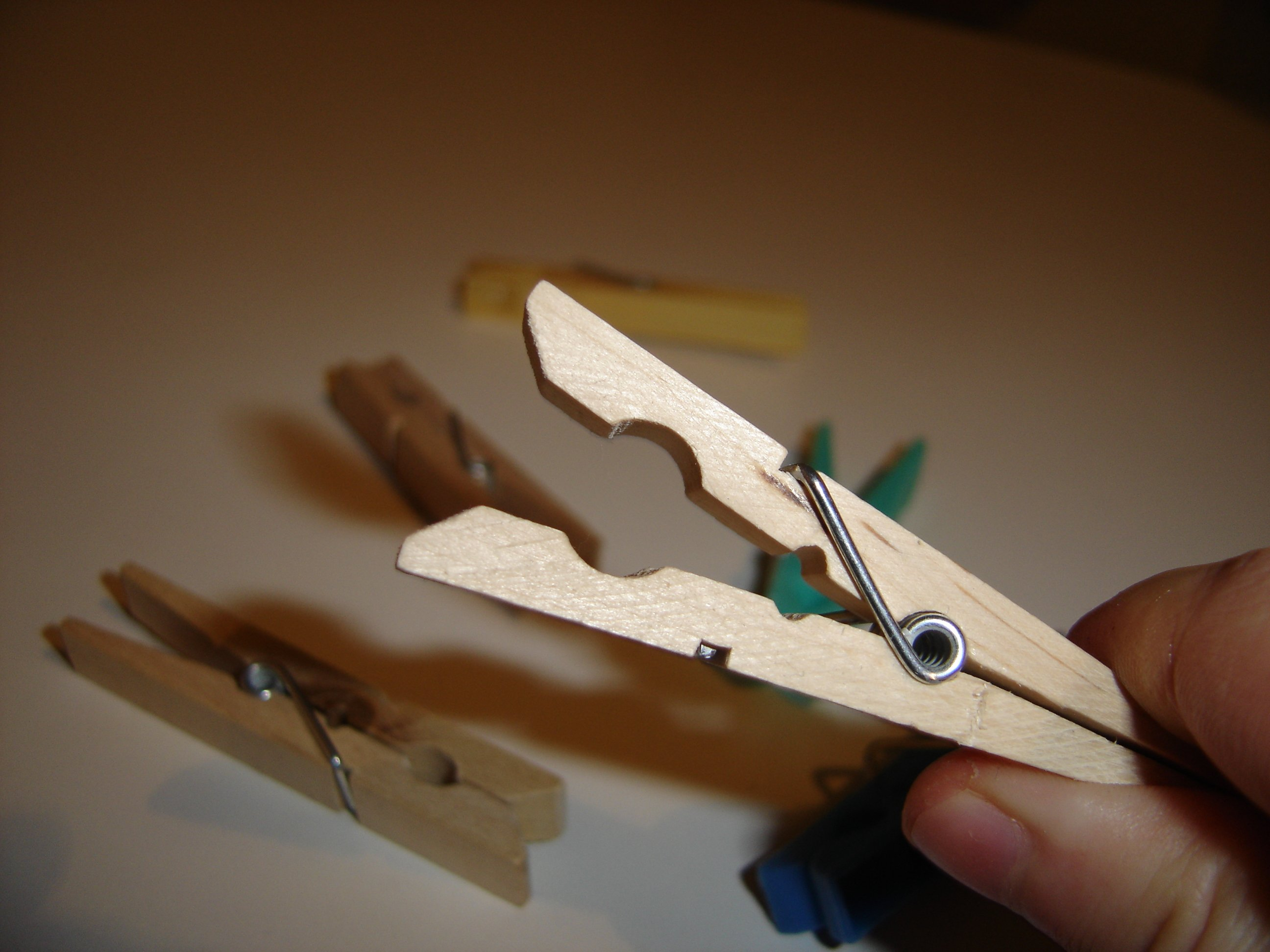
A clothespin with metal lever action

- A clothespin is a fastener with a lever action used to hang up clothes for drying, usually on a clothes line. Clothespins often come in many different designs. Although wooden clothes pegs had existed for a few decades already, the "spring-clamp" for clotheslines was patented by David M. Smith of Springfield, Vermont, in 1853.

1854 Breast pump

- A breast pump is a mechanical device that extracts milk from the breasts of a lactating woman. Breast pumps may be manual devices powered by hand or foot movements or electrical devices powered by mains electricity or batteries. The first breast pump was patented by O.H. Needham on June 20, 1854.

1855 Calliope

- Also known as a steam organ or steam piano, a calliope is a musical instrument that produces sound by sending a gas, originally steam or more recently compressed air, through large whistles, originally locomotive whistles. It was often played on riverboats and in circuses, where it was sometimes mounted on a carved, painted and gilded horse-drawn wagon in a circus parade. The calliope was invented in 1855 by Joshua C. Stoddard of Worcester, Massachusetts. U.S. patent #13,668 was issued to Stoddard on October 9, 1855.

1856 Egg beater

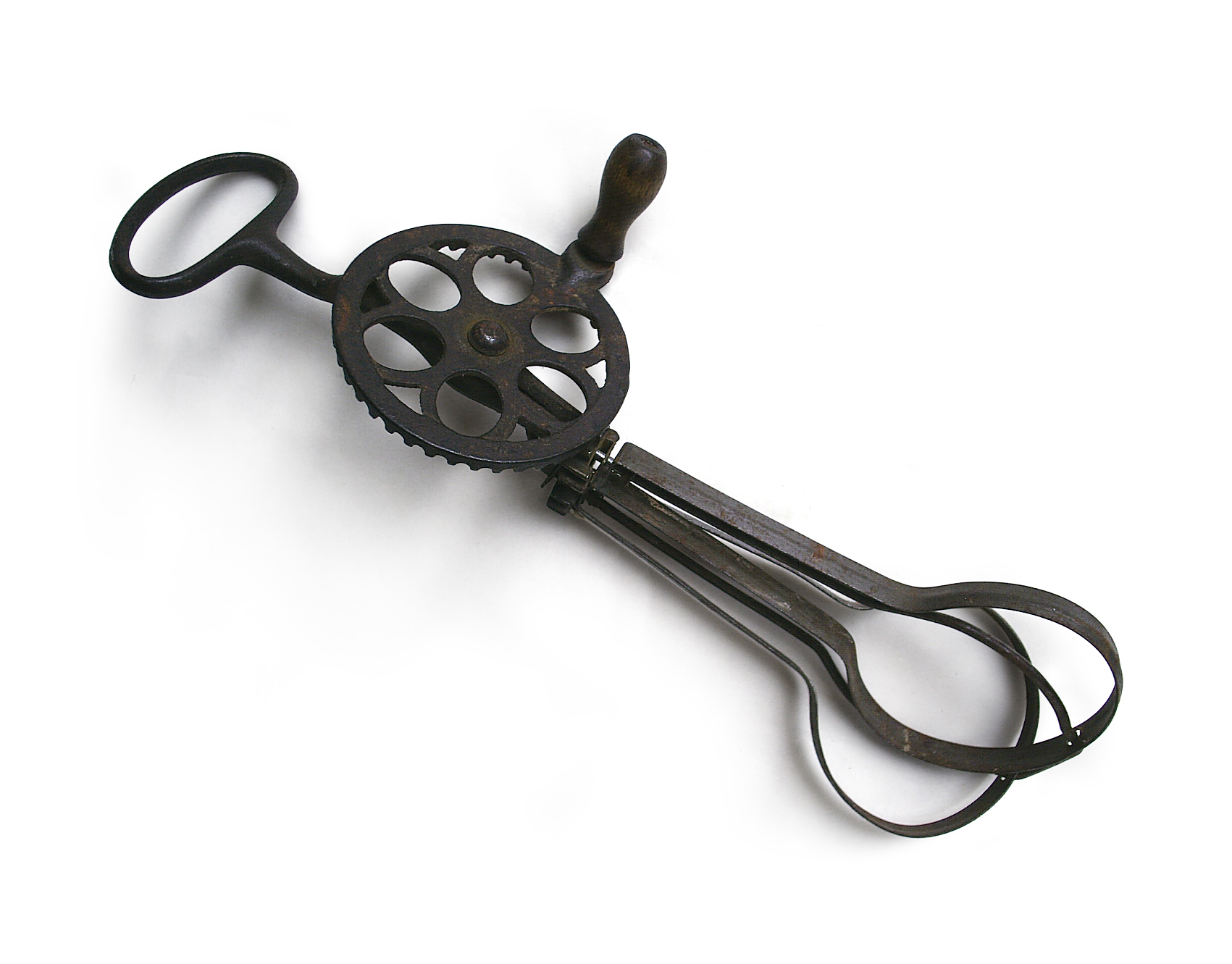
A vintage egg beater

- An egg beater is a hand-cranked mixing device for whipping, beating, and folding food ingredients. It typically consists of a handle mounted over a piston, which drives one or two beaters. The beaters are immersed in the food to be mixed. In 1856, American tinner Ralph Collier of Baltimore, Maryland, invented and patented the first rotary egg beater with rotating parts. Collier was issued U.S. patent #16,267 on December 23, 1856.

1856 Condensed milk

- Condensed milk is cow's milk from which water has been removed and to which sugar has been added, yielding a very thick, sweet product that can last for years without refrigeration if unopened. Gail Borden invented condensed milk in 1856 and was later used by soldiers during the American Civil War.

1856 Equatorial sextant

- The equatorial sextant is a navigational instrument that is used to get an accurate bearing and position of a ship at sea, and to take azimuths, altitude, time and declination while making observations.to take azimuths, altitude, time and declination while making observations Also known as an altitude Instrument, the equatorial sextant was first invented and made by William Austin Burt. He patented it in November 1856, in the United States as U.S. patent #16,002.

1857 Toilet paper (mass-produced and rolled)

- Toilet paper is a soft paper product (tissue paper) used to maintain personal hygiene after human defecation or urination. However, it can also be used for other purposes such as absorbing spillages or craft projects. Toilet paper in different forms has been used for centuries, namely in China. The ancient Greeks used clay and stone; the Romans, sponges and salt water. But according to a CNN article, the idea of a commercial product designed solely to wipe a person's buttocks was by New York City entrepreneur Joseph Gayetty, who in 1857, invented aloe-infused sheets of manila hemp dispensed from Kleenex-like boxes. However, Gayetty's toilet paper was a failure for several reasons. Americans soon grew accustomed to wiping with the Sears Roebuck catalog, they saw no need to spend money on toilet paper when catalogs for their use came in the mail for free, and because during the 19th century, it was a social taboo to openly discuss bathroom hygiene with others. Toilet paper took its next leap forward in 1890, when two brothers named Clarence and E. Irvin Scott of the Scott Paper Company co-invented rolled toilet paper.

1857 Pink lemonade

- Pink lemonade is a variant of lemonade that uses artificial flavors and colors as well as natural sources of juices (such as grenadine, cherry juice, red grapefruit juice, grape juice, cranberry juice, strawberry juice, and pomegranate) to give it a "pink" coloration. The earliest reference to the invention of pink lemonade according to historian Joe Nickell, was that Pete Conklin invented the drink in 1857 when he used water dyed pink from a horse rider's red tights to make his lemonade.

1857 Brown Truss

- A Brown truss is a type of bridge truss, used in covered bridges. It is noted for its economical use of materials, taking the form of a box truss. There may be vertical or almost vertical tension members, but there are no vertical members in compression. In practice, when used in a covered bridge, the most common application, the truss is protected with outside sheathing. The Brown Truss was invented and patented by Josiah Brown Jr. in 1857.

1858 screw top Pepper shaker

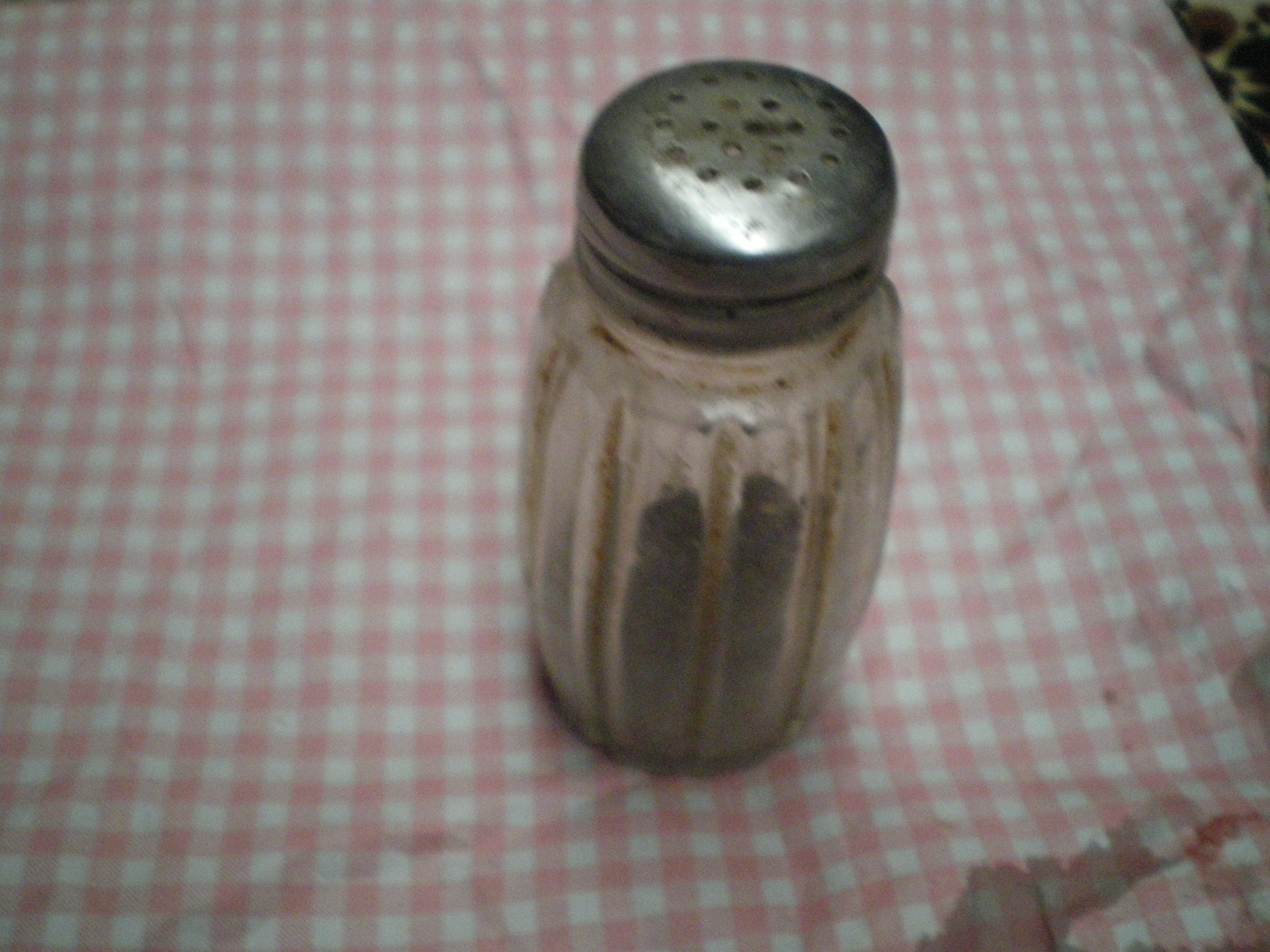
A pepper shaker with a screw-on cap

- Salt and pepper shakers are typically placed on tabletops in restaurants and in home kitchens. Used as condiment holders in Western culture, salt and pepper shakers are designed to store and dispense edible salt and ground peppercorns. The first pepper shaker with screw-on cap was invented by John Landis Mason who received a patent on November 30, 1858.

1858 Mason jar

- In home canning, food is packed into a jar, and the steel lid is placed on top of the jar with the integral rubber seal resting on the rim of the jar. The band is screwed loosely over the lid, which will allow air and steam to escape. By far, though, the most popular form of seal was the screw-on zinc cap, the precursor to today's screw-on lids. The earliest glass jars were called wax sealers, because they used sealing wax, which was poured into a channel around the lip that held on a tin lid. The earliest successful application of this was discovered by John Landis Mason and patented on November 30, 1858, a date embossed on millions of jars for food preservation and pickling.

1858 Pencil eraser

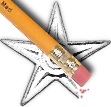
An eraser attached to a graphite pencil

- A pencil eraser is an article of stationery attached to the opposite end of a graphite pencil's sharpened tip. The eraser itself is typically made out of gum-like or synthetic rubber that is used for rubbing out pencil mistakes on paper. On April 15, 1770, English inventor Joseph Priestley described a vegetable gum to remove pencil marks. On March 30, 1858, Hymen Lipman received the first patent for the conception and the idea of attaching an eraser to the end of a pencil. In 1862 Lipman sold his patent to Joseph Reckendorfer for $100,000, who went to sue the pencil manufacturer Faber-Castell for infringement. In 1875, the Supreme Court of the United States ruled against Reckendorfer declaring the patent invalid.

1858 Ironing board

- An ironing board is a portable and foldable table with a heat-resistant top used in the aid of removing wrinkles from clothing with an iron and spray starch. The first ironing board was co-patented on February 16, 1858, by inventors William Vandenburg and James Harvey of New York City.

1858 Twine knotter

- A twine binder is a mechanical device or machine that wraps knotted twine around a bundle or sheave of grain in bound form after it has been reaped. While working at a farm in Whitewater, Wisconsin in 1857, John Appleby invented the twine knotter. Incorporating many of Jacob Behel's innovations as found in his development of the "billhook" knotter in 1864, Appleby later sold the patent around the year 1877 to William Deering who began the manufacturing and exploited the practicability of Appleby's twine knotter into a commercially profitable reaper-binder.

1858 Dustpan

- A dustpan is a cleaning utensil commonly used in combination with a broom. The dustpan may appear to be a type of flat scoop. The dustpan was invented and patented (U.S. patent #20,811) by the American inventor T.E. McNeill in 1858.

1859 Electric stove

- An electric stove is a large kitchen appliance that converts electricity into heat in order to cook and bake food. In addition to heated coils atop a stovetop range, glass-ceramic cooktops and induction stoves using electromagnetic induction have proven to be popular in commercial kitchens as well as for domestic use in homes. Canadian inventor Thomas Ahearn is often credited with inventing the electric cooking range in 1882. However, the first such patent for an electrical stove apparatus was awarded in the United States much earlier to George B. Simpson on September 20, 1859. Simpson's patent, US patent #25532 for an 'electro-heater' surface heated by a platinum-wire coil powered by batteries; is described in his own words to be useful to "warm rooms, boil water, cook victuals...".

1859 Escalator

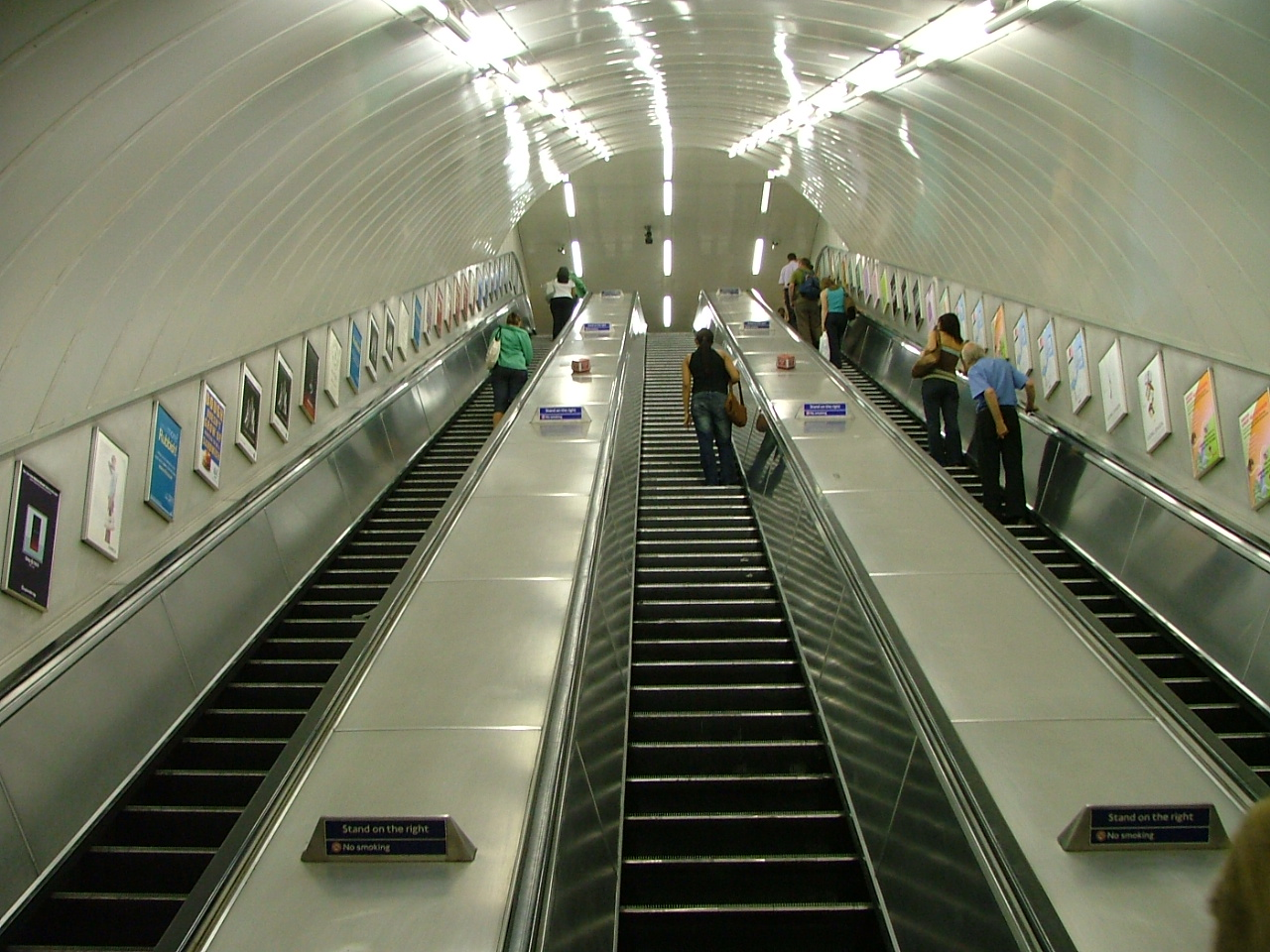
A typical escalator tube on the London Underground

- An escalator is a moving staircase, a conveyor transport device for carrying people between floors of a building. Commonly found and used in shopping malls, department stores, airports, an escalator consists of a motor-driven chain of individual, linked steps that move up or down on tracks, allowing the step treads to remain horizontal. The escalator was invented in 1859 by Nathan Ames of Saugus, Massachusetts for an invention that he called "Revolving Stairs". However, Ames' escalator was never built. The earliest form of a working escalator, patented in 1892 by Jesse W. Reno, was introduced as a new novelty ride at the Old Iron Pier at Coney Island, New York in 1896.

1860 Vacuum cleaner

- A vacuum cleaner uses a partial vacuum to suck up dust and dirt, usually from floors. Daniel Hess of West Union, Iowa, invented the first vacuum cleaner in 1860. Calling it a carpet sweeper instead of a vacuum cleaner, his machine did, in fact, have a rotating brush like a traditional vacuum cleaner which also possessed an elaborate bellows mechanism on top of the body to generate suction of dust and dirt. Hess received a patent (U.S. patent #29,077) for his invention of the first vacuum cleaner on July 10, 1860. Despite credit usually going to English inventor Hubert Cecil Booth for inventing the first electric vacuum cleaner in 1901, his vacuum was actually predated two years by an American, John Thurman of St. Louis, Missouri, who invented the motorized vacuum cleaner in 1899. However, neither were practical or useful. The first practical and portable vacuum cleaner was built in 1907, when James Murray Spangler, a janitor from Canton, Ohio, incorporated a rotating brush, an electric fan, a box, and one of his wife's pillowcases to serve as the dust bag.

1860 Repeating rifle (lever action)

- A repeating rifle is a single barreled rifle containing multiple rounds of ammunition. Benjamin Tyler Henry, chief designer for Oliver Fisher Winchester's arms company, adapted a breech-loading rifle built by Walter Hunt and invented the first practical lever action repeating rifle in 1860. First known as the Henry rifle, it became famously known as the Winchester by Union soldiers in the American Civil War.

== Civil War and the Reconstruction Era (1861–1877) ==
1861 Jelly bean

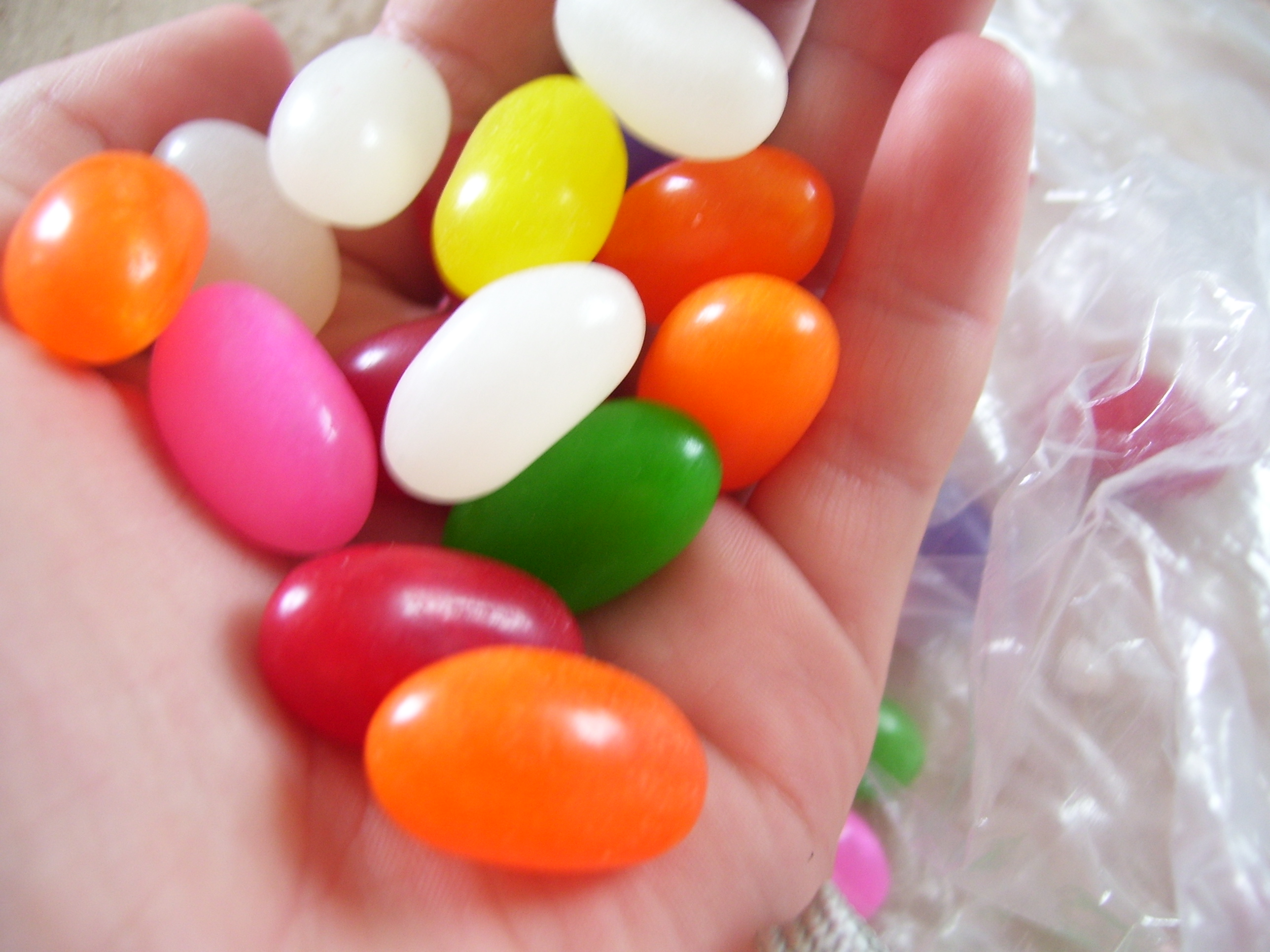
A handful of jelly beans

- Jelly beans are a small bean-shaped type of confectionery with a hard candy shell and a gummy interior which come in a wide variety of flavors. The confection is primarily made of sugar. The Turkish delight, a Middle Eastern candy made of soft jelly, covered in confectioner's powder, with roots dating to biblical days, was an early precursor to the jelly bean that inspired its gummy interior. However, it is generally thought that jelly beans first surfaced in 1861 when Boston confectioner and inventor William Schrafft urged people to send his jelly beans to soldiers during the American Civil War. It wasn't until July 5, 1905, that the mentioning of jelly beans was published in the Chicago Daily News. The advertisement publicized bulk jelly beans sold by volume for nine cents per pound, according to the book, "The Century in Food: America's Fads and Favorites". Today, most historians contend that in the United States, they were first linked with Easter in the 1930s.

1861 Twist drill

- A twist drill is a bit with two cut grooves in opposite sides of a round bar, whereby the twisted bar produces a helical flute in order to drill holes in metal, plastic, or wood. The twist drill was invented by Stephen A. Morse in October 1861 and later patented on April 7, 1863.

1861 Kinematoscope

- The kinematoscope is a device using the principles of stereoscopy in order to present the illusion of a motion picture. Viewed from inside a cabinet, the images with chronologically successive stages of action which were mounted on blades of a spinning paddle. The kinematoscope was invented by Coleman Sellers II of Philadelphia who received U.S. patent #31,357 on February 5, 1861.

1861 Postcard

- A postcard or post card is a rectangular piece of material, such as paper, leather or other materials, intended for writing and mailing without an envelope. "Postal card" is the term used for a post card issued by a postal authority, generally with postage prepaid. The post card was invented by John P. Charlton of Philadelphia in 1861 for which he obtained the copyright later transferred to Hymen Lipman. The cards were adorned with a small border and labeled "Lipman's Postal Card, Patent Applied For". and later "Copy-right Secured 1861". They were on the market until 1873 when the first United States issued postcards appeared.

1861 Machine gun (hand-cranked)

- The machine gun is typically considered to be a fully automatic firearm, usually designed to fire rifle cartridges in quick succession from an ammunition belt or large-capacity magazine. The Gatling gun, invented and patented in 1861 by Richard Gatling during the American Civil War, was the earliest precursor to a machine gun in the sense that it had all of the underlying features of reliable loading as well as the ability to fire sustained multiple bursts of rounds, the only drawback being, it had to be manually operated and hand-cranked unlike its 1884 successor, the Maxim gun, which was indisputably the world's first true machine gun.

1863 Breakfast cereal

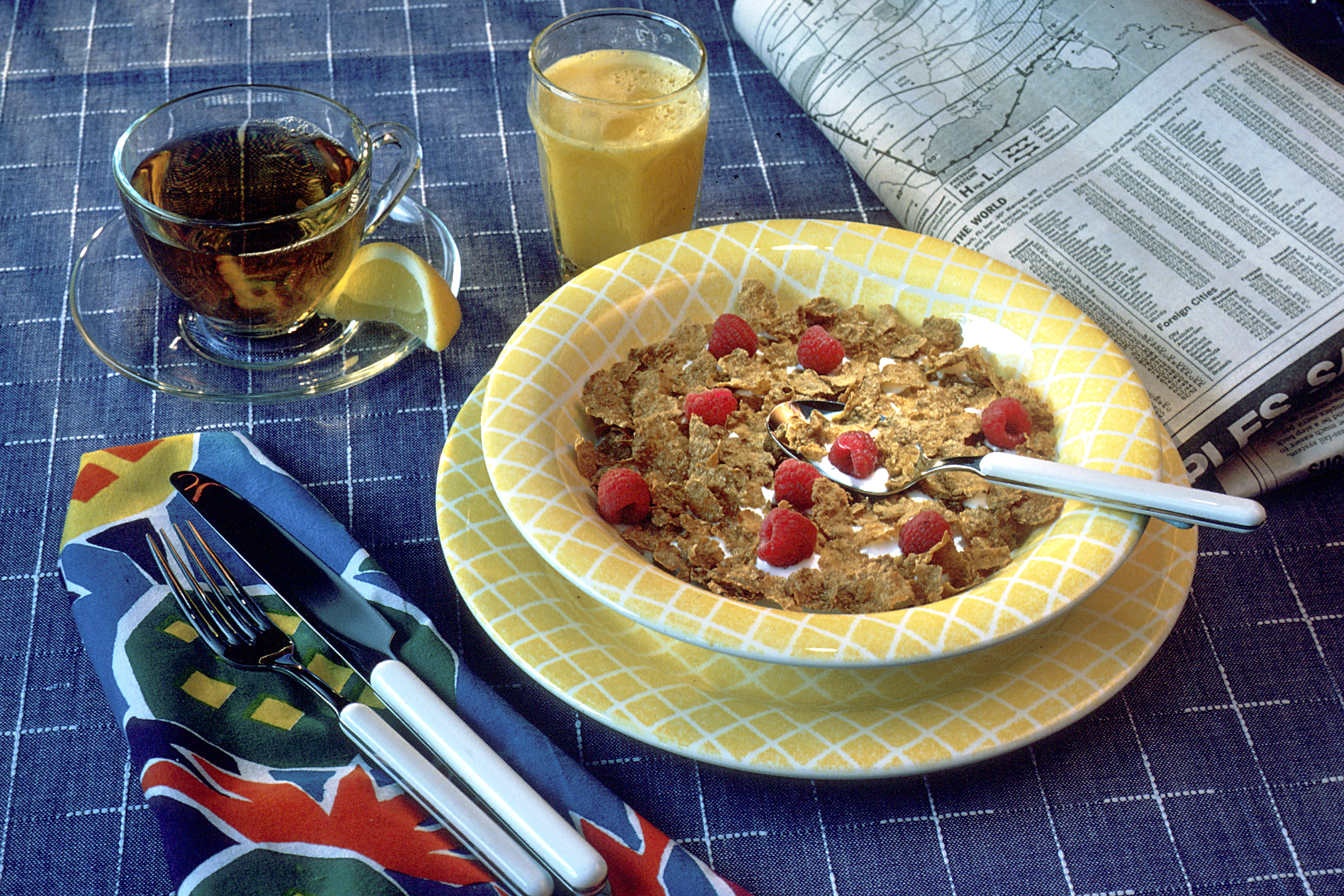
A bowl of breakfast cereal filled with milk and topped with raspberries

- Breakfast cereal is a packaged food product intended to be consumed as part of a breakfast. The first breakfast cereal, Granula was invented in the United States in 1863 by James Caleb Jackson, operator of the Jackson Sanitorium in Dansville, New York. The cereal never became popular since it was inconvenient, as the heavy bran nuggets needed soaking overnight before they were tender enough to eat.

1863 Ratchet wrench

- A socket wrench, more commonly referred to as a ratchet, is a type of wrench, or tightening tool, that uses separate, removable sockets to fit many different sizes of fittings and fasteners, most commonly nuts and bolts. The ratchet wrench was invented by J.J. Richardson of Woodstock, Vermont, receiving a patent for the ratchet wrench from the Scientific American Patent Agency on June 18, 1863.

1863 Quad skates

- Quad skates are four-wheeled turning roller skates set in two side-by-side pairs. In 1863, James Leonard Plimpton of Medford, Massachusetts, invented the first four-wheeled roller skates arranged in two side-by-side pairs. Before Plimpton's invention, all wheels on the bottom of roller skates were inline.

1863 Double-barreled cannon

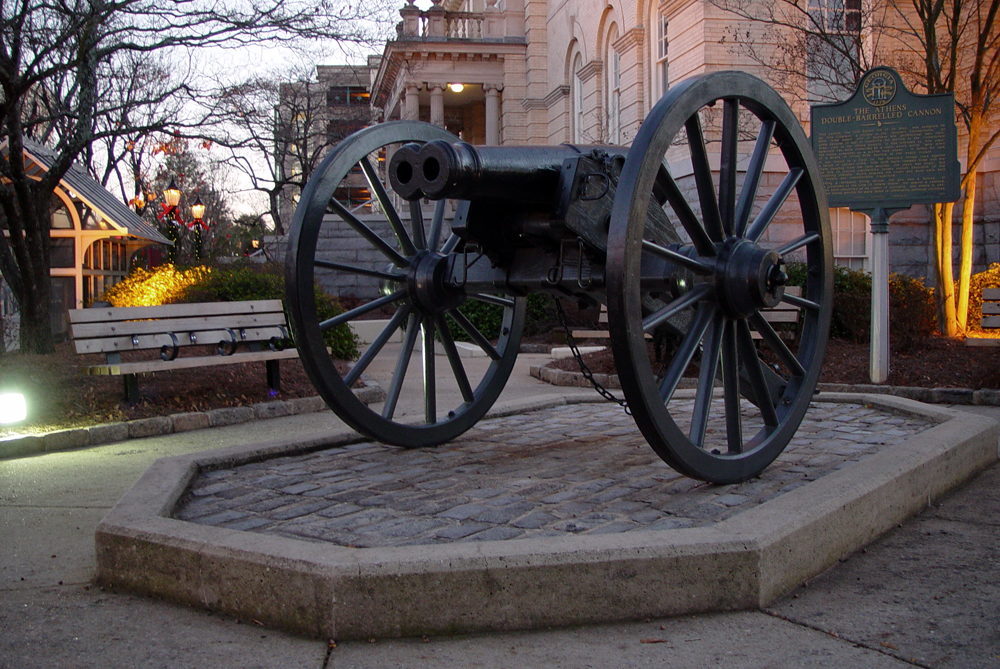
The double-barreled cannon prototype located in Athens, Georgia

- The double-barreled cannon is an American Civil War-era experimental weapon that was intended to fire two cannonballs connected with a chain. While originally built for warfare for the Confederacy, the cannon never saw battle. The prototype is now on display and is a modern landmark located in Athens, Georgia. In 1863, John Gilleland invented the double-barreled cannon.

1864 Spar torpedo

- The spar torpedo consists of a bomb placed at the end of a long pole, or spar, and attached to a boat. The weapon is used by running the end of the spar into the enemy ship. Spar torpedoes were often equipped with a barbed spear at the end, so it would stick to wooden hulls. A fuse could then be used to detonate it. The spar torpedo was invented in 1864 during the American Civil War by E. C. Singer, a private engineer who worked on secret projects for the benefit of the Confederate States of America.

1865 Cowboy hat

- The cowboy hat is a high-crowned, wide-brimmed hat best known as the defining piece of attire for the North American cowboy. Today it is worn by many people, and is particularly associated with ranch workers in the western and southern United States, western Canada and northern Mexico, with country-western singers, and for participants in the North American rodeo circuit. It is recognized around the world as part of Old West cowboy lore. The shape of a cowboy hat's crown and brim are often modified by the wearer for fashion and to protect against weather. The cowboy hat was invented in 1865 by John Batterson Stetson during a hunting trip, showing his companions how he could make fabric out of fur without weaving. Using the fur collected during the trip, his bare hands, and boiling water, Stetson made a piece of felt and then shaped it into a hat with a large brim which could protect him and his hunting party from weather elements such as rain, wind, and snow.

1865 Rotary printing press (web)

- In 1865, William Bullock invented a printing press that could feed paper on a continuous roll and print both sides of the paper at once. Used first by the Philadelphia Ledger, the machine would become an American standard. It would also kill its inventor, who died when he accidentally fell into one of his presses.

1866 Urinal (restroom version)

- Not to be confused with the urinal in bottle form that is used in healthcare, a urinal is a specialized toilet for urinating only, generally by men and boys. It is wall-mounted, with drainage and automatic or manual flushing. The urinal was patented by Andrew Rankin on March 27, 1866.

1866 Chuckwagon

- The chuckwagon is a wagon that carries food and cooking equipment on the prairies of the United States and Canada. They were part of a wagon train of settlers to feed nomadic workers like cowboys or loggers. While mobile kitchens had existed for generations, the invention of the chuckwagon is attributed to Texan rancher Charles Goodnight who introduced the concept in 1866.

1867 Motorcycle (steam-powered)

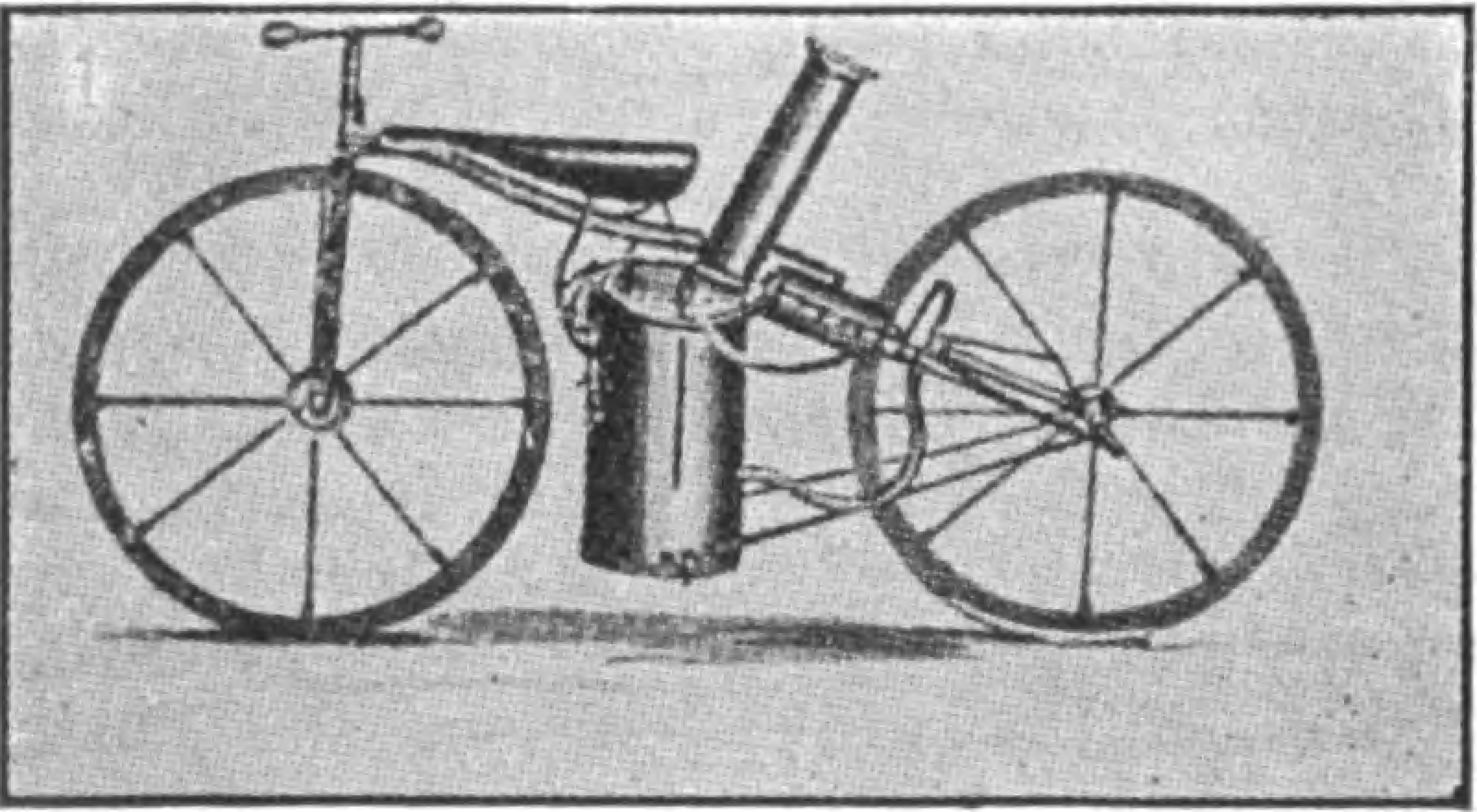
An 1860s drawing of the Roper steam velocipede

- The motorcycle is a single-track, two-wheeled motor vehicle powered by an engine. Although the first gasoline/petrol motorcycle powered by an internal combustion engine was built in 1885 by a German named Gottlieb Daimler, his may not have been the first motorcycle. Ironically, Daimler's motorcycle used a four-stroke internal combustion engine that wasn't of his own creation, instead having to rely upon an engine built by Nicolaus August Otto which he simply mounted onto the frame of a bicycle. Furthermore, if the definition of a motorcycle is inclusive of a steam engine and not exclusive to an internal combustion engine, then the world's first motorcycle may either have been American; a coal-powered, two-cylinder, steam-driven motorcycle known as the Roper steam velocipede invented by Sylvester Howard Roper in 1867; or perhaps a French one, independently invented by a competing claim by French blacksmith Pierre Michaux and engineer Louis-Guillaume Perreaux, who invented the Michaux-Perreaux steam velocipede in 1868.

1867 Paper clip

- The paper clip attaches sheets of paper together, allowing them to be detached as necessary. The first patent for a bent wire paper clip was awarded to its inventor, Samuel B. Fay, in 1867.

1867 Barbed wire

- Barbed wire is a type of fencing wire constructed with sharp edges or points arranged at intervals along the strands. It is used to construct inexpensive fences and is used atop walls surrounding secured property. It is also a major feature of the fortifications in trench warfare. A person or animal trying to pass through or over barbed wire will suffer discomfort and possibly injury. Barbed wire fencing requires only fence posts, wire, and fixing devices such as staples. On June 25, 1867, Lucien B. Smith of Kent, Ohio, patented barbed wire. Shortly thereafter, several other inventors, such as Joseph F. Glidden of DeKalb, Illinois, patented inventions for similar products, but Smith patented his first, allowing him to claim that he invented barbed wire.

1867 Ticker tape

- Ticker tape is a means of transmitting stock price information over telegraph lines. It consists of a paper strip which ran through a machine called a stock ticker, which printed abbreviated company symbols followed by price and volume information. Ticker tape was invented in 1867 by Edward A. Calahan, an employee of the American Telegraph Company.

1867 Water-tube boiler

- A water-tube boiler is a type of boiler in which water circulates in tubes heated externally by the fire. Water-tube boilers are used for high-pressure boilers. Fuel is burned inside the furnace, creating hot gas which heats up water in the steam-generating tubes. The water-tube boiler was co-invented and co-patented by George Herman Babcock and Stephen Wilcox in 1867.

1867 Refrigerator car

- A refrigerator car or "reefer" is a refrigerated boxcar, designed to carry perishable freight at specific temperatures. Refrigerator cars differ from simple insulated boxcars and ventilated boxcars, neither of which are fitted with cooling apparatus. They can be ice-cooled, or use one of a variety of mechanical refrigeration systems, or utilize carbon dioxide as a cooling agent. In the 1860s, slaughtered cattle from the Great Plains were preserved in barrels of salt. Regular box cars were loaded with ice in another effort to preserve fresh meat that had limited success. Generally, it was found more economical in the early days of refrigeration to cool the cars with ice or frozen brine which was periodically replenished at icing stations along rail routes. In 1857, the first shipment of refrigerated beef was made from the Chicago stockyards to the East Coast in an ordinary box car packed with ice. Finally in 1867, the first patent (U.S. Patent #71,423) for a specialized refrigerator car was issued to its inventor, J.B. Sutherland of Detroit, Michigan.

1868 Paper bag

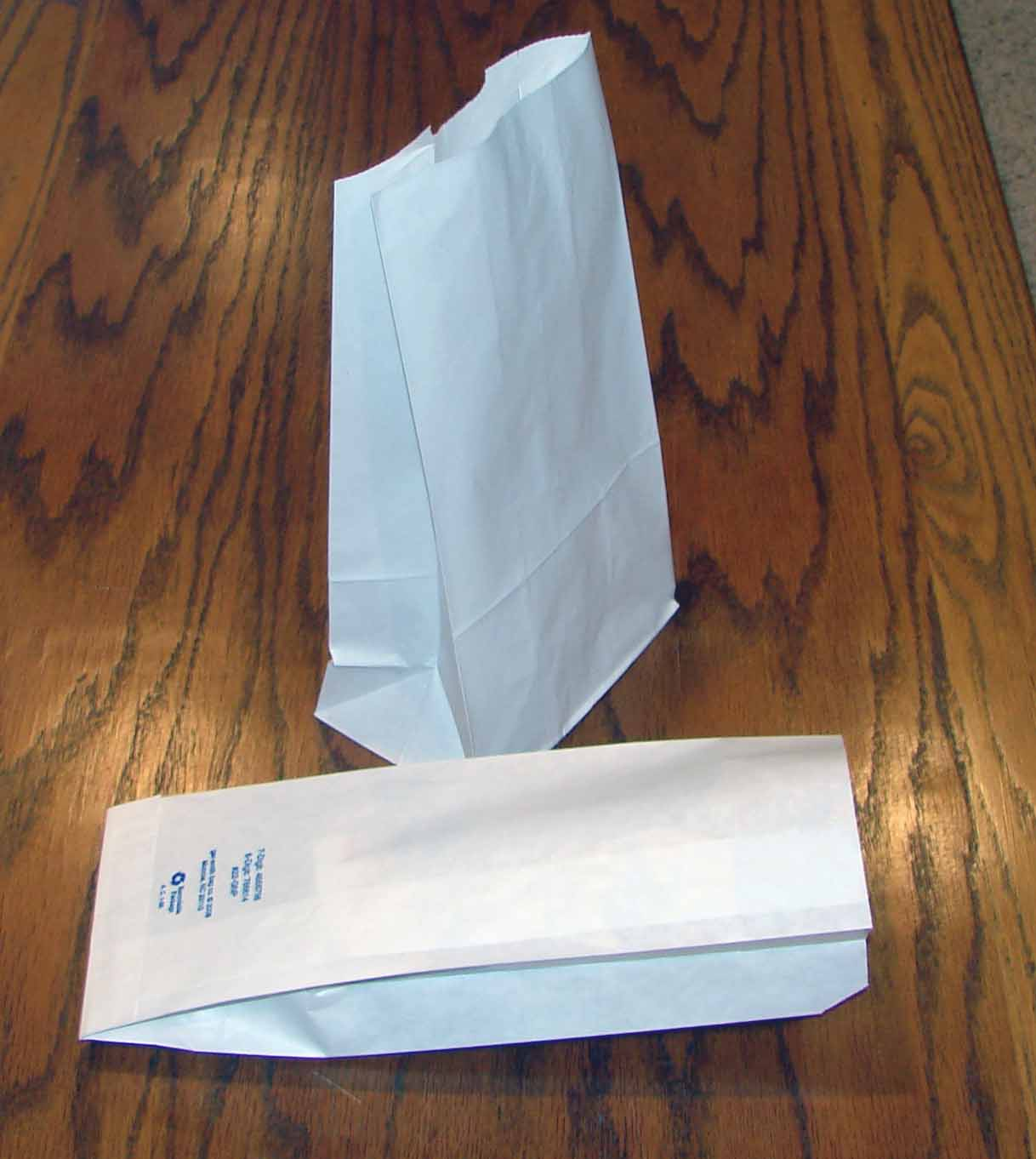
Two paper bags

- A bag is a non-rigid or semi-rigid container usually made of paper which is used to hold items or packages. In 1868, Margaret E. Knight while living in Springfield, Massachusetts invented a machine that folded and glued paper to form the brown paper bags familiar to what shoppers know and use today.

1868 Tape measure

- A tape measure or measuring tape is a flexible form of ruler. It consists of a ribbon of cloth, plastic, fiber glass, or metal strip with linear-measurement markings. The design on which most modern spring tape measures are built was invented and patented by a New Haven, Connecticut resident named Alvin J. Fellows on July 14, 1868.

1869 Vibrator

- A vibrator is a device intended to vibrate against the body and stimulate the nerves for a relaxing and pleasurable feeling. Some vibrators are designed as sex toys and are inserted inside the vagina or anus for erotic stimulation. The first vibrator was a steam-powered massager, which was invented by American physician George Taylor in 1869. Dr. Taylor recommended his vibrators for treatment of an illness known at the time as "female hysteria". Hysteria, from the Greek for "suffering uterus", involved anxiety, irritability, sexual fantasies, pelvic heaviness, and excessive vaginal lubrication—in other words, sexual arousal.

1869 American football

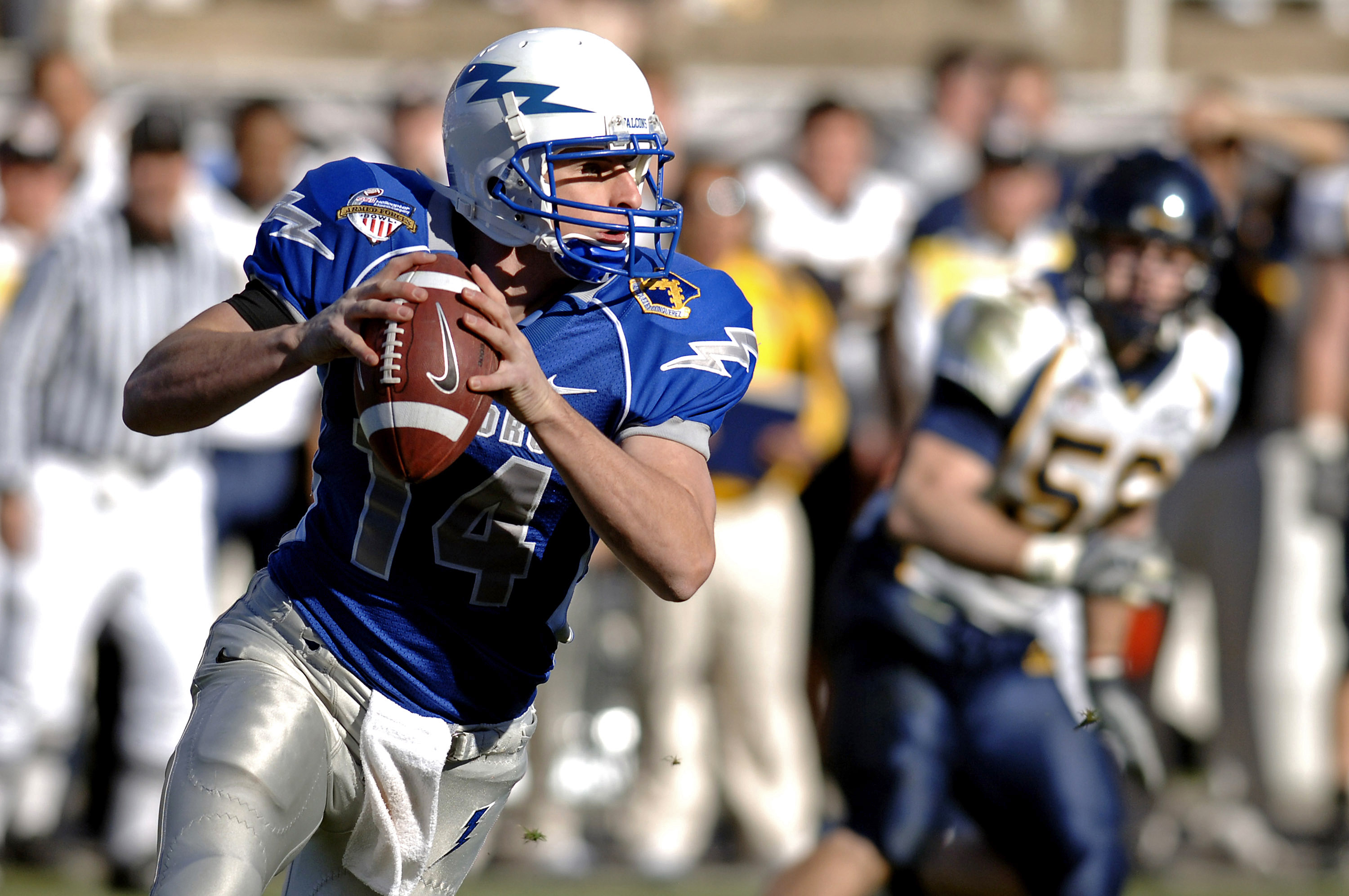
A quarterback preparing to throw a pass

- American football, known in the United States simply as football, is a spectator sport known for combining strategy with competitive physical play. The objective of the game is to score points by advancing the ball into the opposing team's end zone. The ball can be advanced by carrying it (a running play) or by throwing it to a teammate (a passing play). Points can be scored in a variety of ways, including carrying the ball over the opponent's goal line, catching a pass thrown over that goal line, kicking the ball through the goal posts at the opponent's end zone, or tackling an opposing ball carrier within his end zone. The winner is the team with the most points when the time expires. The very first game of American football, a collegiate one, was held on November 6, 1869, between Rutgers University and Princeton University with a final score of Rutgers 6 Princeton 4. The first professional game of American football was held on November 12, 1892, between the Allegheny Athletic Association and the Pittsburgh Athletic Club ending in a 6–6 tie. As a descendant of rugby, the modern sport now known as American football is generally credited to its inventor, Walter Camp, who beginning in the 1880s, devised the play from scrimmage, the numerical assessment of goals and tries, the restriction of play to eleven men per side, set plays, sequences, and strategy features which led to the gradual evolution of the regulated game. Camp also was the leader of the American Football Rules Committee which devised the set of codified and regulated rules as to which American football continuously uses.

1869 Pipe wrench

- The pipe wrench, or Stillson wrench, is an adjustable wrench used for turning soft iron pipes and fittings with a rounded surface. The design of the adjustable jaw allows it to rock in the frame, such that any forward pressure on the handle tends to pull the jaws tighter together. Teeth angled in the direction of turn dig into the soft pipe. The pipe wrench was invented by Daniel C. Stillson in 1869.

1869 Clothes hanger

- A clothes hanger, or coat hanger, is a device in the shape of human shoulders designed to facilitate the hanging of a coat, jacket, sweater, shirt, blouse, or dress in a manner that prevents wrinkles, with a lower bar for the hanging of trousers or skirts. The shoulder-shaped wire hanger, was inspired by a coat hook invented in 1869 by O. A. North of New Britain, Connecticut.

1870 Bee smoker

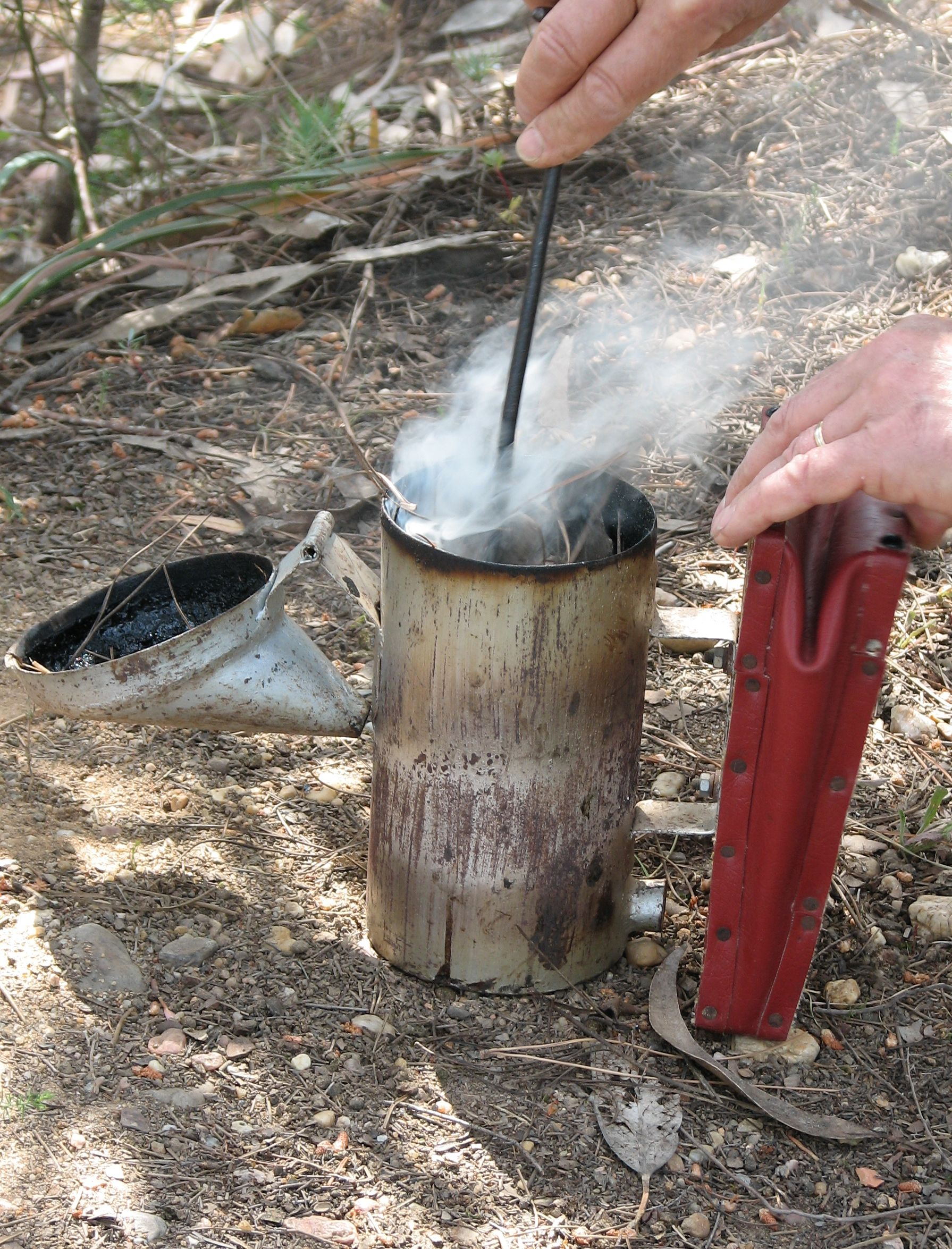
Firing a bee smoker

- A bee smoker, usually called simply a smoker, is a device used in beekeeping to calm honey bees. It is designed to generate smoke from the smouldering of various fuels, hence the name. The first bee smoker, which incorporated a bellows with a fire pot, was invented in 1870 by the renowned American beekeeper, Moses Quinby.

1870 Can opener (rotary, side-opening)

- The can opener is a device used to open metal cans. Most 21st century non-electrical can openers used a crank turning a wheel with serrated edges (to grip and turn) and is fused with a cogwheel which rotates a cogwheel fused with a cutting wheel which presses against and penetrates the can top. The first rotary can opener with a cutting wheel was invented in 1870 by William W. Lyman, of Meriden, Connecticut, who received a U.S. Patent 105,346 on July 12, 1870. In 1925 the Star Can Opener Company of San Francisco improved on Lyman's wheel blade by adding a second, serrated or toothed wheel, called a "feed wheel" or "turning gear" to ride below the rim of the can and rotate the can against the cutting wheel.

1870 Sandblasting

- Sandblasting or bead blasting is a generic term for the process of smoothing, shaping, and cleaning a hard surface by forcing solid particles across that surface at high speeds. Sandblasting equipment typically consists of a chamber in which sand and air are mixed. The mixture travels through a hand-held nozzle to direct the particles toward the surface or workpiece. Nozzles come in a variety of shapes, sizes, and materials. Boron carbide is a popular material for nozzles because it resists abrasive wear well. In 1870, the sandblasting process was invented and patented by Benjamin Chew Tilghman.

1870 Feather duster

- A feather duster is an implement used for cleaning. It consists typically of a wooden-dowel handle and feathers that are wound onto the handle by a wrapped wire. In 1870, the original idea for the feather duster was conceived in a broom factory in Jones County, Iowa. A farmer brought a bundle of turkey feathers into the factory asking if they could be used to assemble a brush. E.E. Hoag used these feathers to invent the first feather duster. Using a short broom stick and splitting the feathers with a pocket knife, the duster was found to be too stiff for use. In 1874, the Hoag Duster Company was founded, which became a pioneer of feather dusters in the U.S. state of Iowa.

1871 Rowing machine

- A rowing machine or indoor rower is a machine used to simulate the action of watercraft rowing for the purpose of exercise or training for rowing. Indoor rowing has become established as a sport in its own right. The term also refers to a participant in this sport. Rowing machines have been in use for about 140 years. The earliest patent for such a machine was filed in the United States by William B. Curtis. Curtis was issued U.S. patent #116,417 on June 27, 1871.

1872 Railway air brake

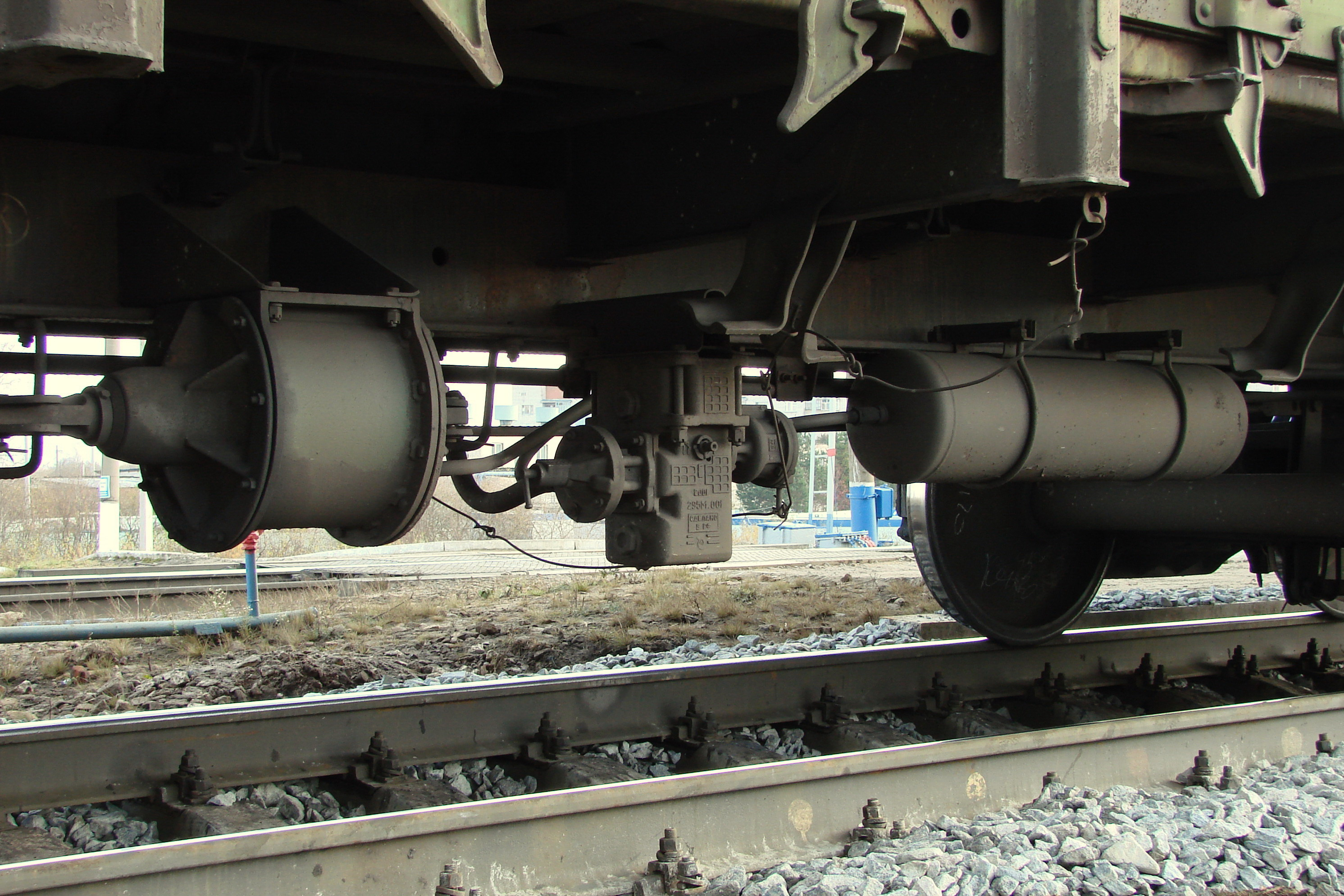
A valve on a railway air brake

- A railway air brake is a conveyance braking system which applies the means of compressed air which modern locomotives use to this day. George Westinghouse, a pioneer of the electrical industry, invented the railroad air brake in 1872.

1872 Diner

- A diner is a restaurant characterized by a wide range of foods, a casual and often nostalgic atmosphere, a counter, and late operating hours. The precursor to the fast food eatery began in 1872 when Walter Scott, a myopic pressman for the Providence Journal, became serious about selling food and refreshments in the streets. Scott had a plan. Instead of wearing out the soles of his shoes and roaming the streets of Providence, Rhode Island, he decided to buy a horse-drawn delivery van. Rolling on four wagon wheels, he would take his food to the people.

1873 Earmuffs

- Earmuffs cover a person's ears for thermal protection. Earmuffs consist of a thermoplastic or metal head-band, that fits over the top of the head, and a pad at each end, to cover the external ears. Earmuffs were invented by Chester Greenwood in 1873.

1873 Silo

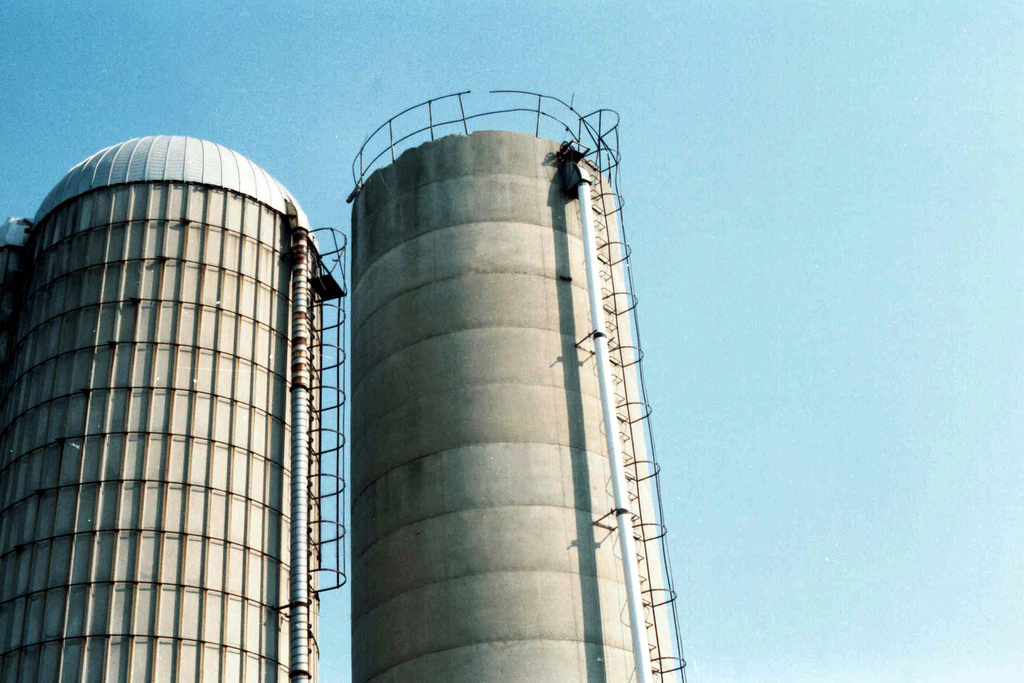
Two farm silos

- A silo is a structure for storing bulk materials. Silos are used in agriculture to store grain, see grain elevators, or fermented feed known as silage. Silos are more commonly used for bulk storage of grain, coal, cement, carbon black, woodchips, food products and sawdust. The first modern silo, a wooden and upright one filled with grain, was invented and built in 1873 by Fred Hatch of McHenry County, Illinois.

1873 Jeans

Jeans are trousers generally made from denim. Jeans became popular among teenagers starting in the 1950s which remains as a distinct icon of American fashion. In 1873, Levi Strauss and Jacob Davis co-invented and co-patented the idea of using copper rivets at the stress points of sturdy work pants. After one of Davis' customers kept purchasing cloth to reinforce torn pants, he had an idea to use copper rivets to reinforce the points of strain, such as on the pocket corners and at the top of the button fly. Davis did not have the required money to purchase a patent, so he wrote to Strauss suggesting that they both go into business together. Early Levis, called "waist overalls", came in a brown canvas duck fabric and a heavy blue denim fabric. His business became extremely successful, revolutionizing the apparel industry.

1873 Knuckle coupler

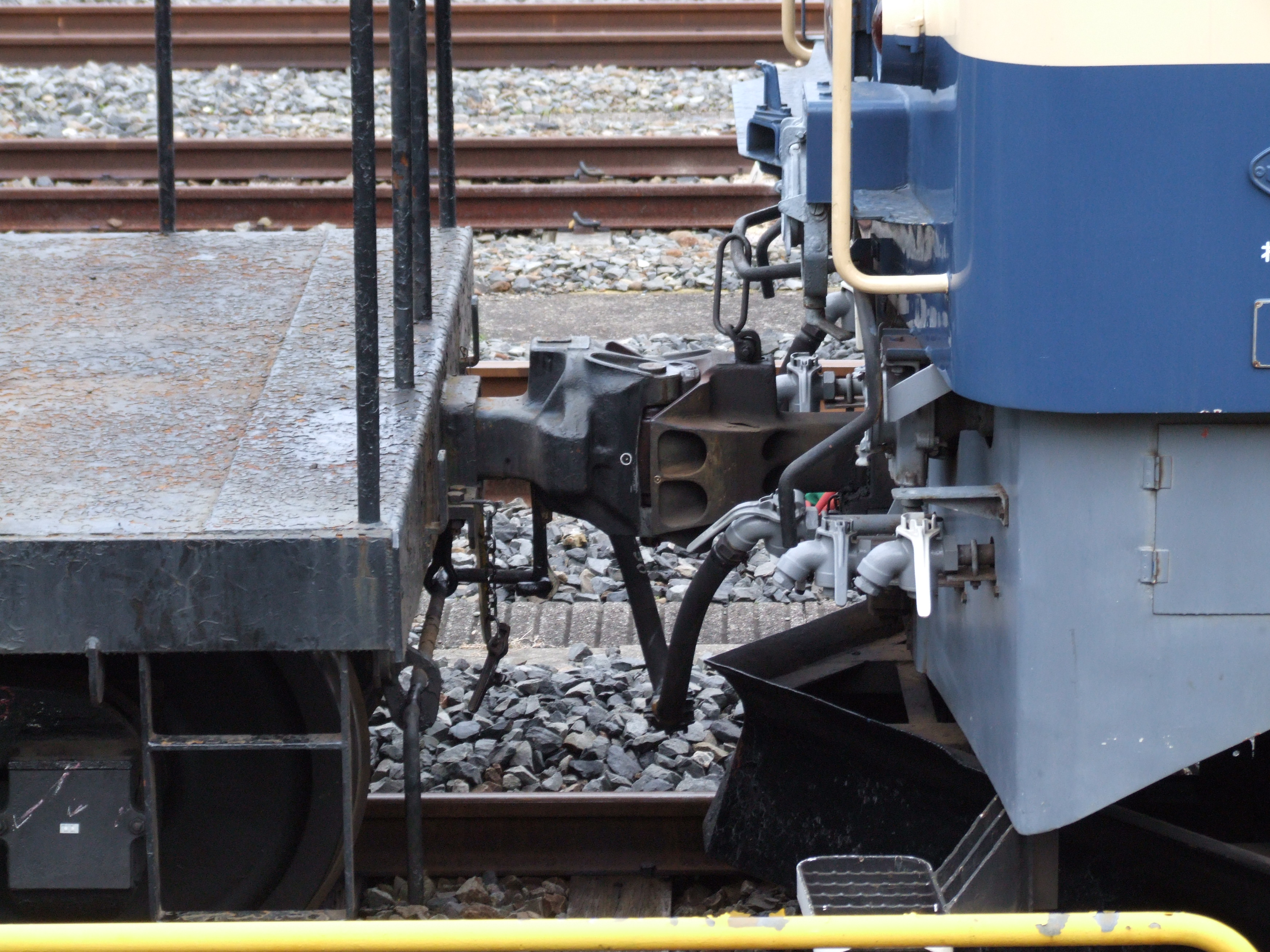
Two railway cars interlocked and joined by a knuckle coupler

Also known as a Janney coupler and the buckeye coupler, the knuckle coupler is the derivative of a coupling device that links and connects rolling railway cars such as passenger, refrigerator, freight, and stock cars together on railroad track. The knuckle coupler have a bifurcated drawhead and a revolving hook, which, when brought in contact with another coupler, automatically interlocks with its mate. Knuckle couplers replaced the much more dangerous link-and-pin couplers and became the basis for standard coupler design for the rest of the 19th century. The knuckle coupler was invented and patented by Eli H. Janney in 1873.

1874 Fire sprinkler (automated)

A fire sprinkler is the part of a fire sprinkler system that discharges water when the effects of a fire have been detected, such as when a pre-determined temperature has been reached. Henry S. Parmelee of New Haven, Connecticut invented and installed the first closed-head or automated fire sprinkler in 1874.

1874 Spork

A spork or a foon is a hybrid form of cutlery taking the form of a spoon-like shallow scoop with three or four fork tines. The spork is a portmanteau word combining spoon and fork. The spork was invented in 1874 by Samuel W. Francis. U.S. patent #147,119 was filed on January 22, 1874, and issued to Francis on February 3, 1874.

1874 Ice cream soda

- An ice cream soda is a beverage that consists of one or more scoops of ice cream in either a soft drink or a mixture of flavored syrup and carbonated water. Variations of the ice cream soda are as countless as the varieties of soda and flavors of ice cream. An example of ice cream soda is the root beer float. In 1874, the ice cream soda was invented by Robert M. Green of Philadelphia. Green's invention paved the way for the soda fountain industry to flourish and for many new spoon novelties such as ice cream sundaes to be created.

1874 Quadruplex telegraph

- A quadruplex telegraph is a type of electrical telegraph which allows a total of four separate signals to be transmitted and received on a single wire at the same time. With two signals in each direction, quadruplex telegraphy thus implements a form of multiplexing. The quadruplex telegraph was invented by Thomas Alva Edison in 1874, which enabled Western Union to save money by greatly increasing the number of messages the company could send without building new lines. It also allowed the company to use its existing lines more efficiently to meet seasonal increases in message traffic and to lease excess capacity for private lines.

1874 Jockstrap

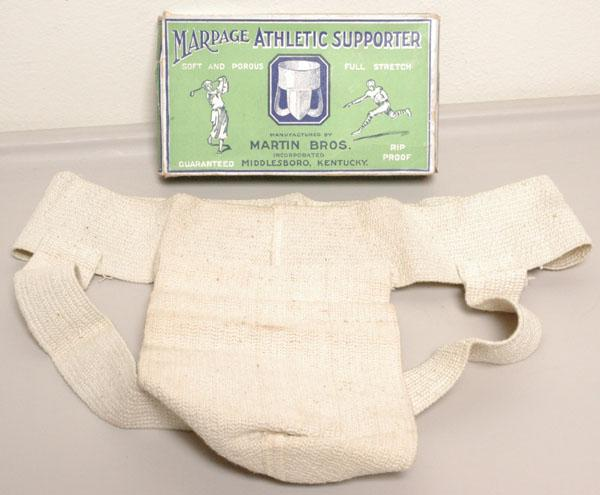
Marpage jockstrap and packaging, circa 1930

A jockstrap, also known as a jock, jock strap, strap, supporter, or athletic supporter, is an undergarment designed for supporting the male genitalia during sports or other vigorous physical activity. A jockstrap consists of a waistband (usually elastic) with a support pouch for the genitalia and two elastic straps affixed to the base of the pouch and to the left and right sides of the waistband at the hip. The jockstrap has been part of men's undergarments since 1874 when it was invented by C.F. Bennett of Chicago to protect and support bicycle riders (back then they were known as "jockeys") who were navigating the cobblestone streets common to the era.

1874 Forstner bit

Forstner bits, also known as Forstner flange bits or webfoot augers, bore precise, flat-bottomed holes in wood, in any orientation with respect to the wood grain. Forstner bits can cut on the edge of a block of wood, and can cut overlapping holes. Because of the flat bottom to the hole, they are useful for drilling through veneer already glued to add an inlay. Forstner bits were invented and patented by Benjamin Forstner in 1874.

1874 QWERTY

QWERTY is the most used modern-day keyboard layout on English-language computer and typewriter keyboards. It takes its name from the first six characters seen in the far left of the keyboard's top row of letters. The QWERTY design was invented and patented by Christopher Sholes in 1874.

1875 Biscuit cutter

- A biscuit cutter a tool to cut out a biscuit from bread dough in a particular shape before they are put into an oven to bake. On May 11, 1875, Alexander P. Ashbourne filed the first patent for the biscuit cutter that consisted of a board to roll the biscuits out on and hinged to a metal plate with various biscuit cutter shapes mounted to it. It was later issued on November 30, 1875.

1875 Dental drill (electric)

- A dental drill is a small, high-speed drill used in dentistry to remove decayed tooth material prior to the insertion of a dental filling. George F. Green of Kalamazoo, Michigan invented the first electric powered device to drill teeth in 1875.

1875 Mimeograph

- The stencil duplicator or mimeograph machine is a low-cost printing press that works by forcing ink through a stencil onto paper. Once prepared, the stencil is wrapped around the ink-filled drum of the rotary machine. When a blank sheet of paper is drawn between the rotating drum and a pressure roller, ink is forced through the holes on the stencil onto the paper. Thomas Alva Edison invented the mimeograph in 1875.

1876 Synthesizer

- A synthesizer is an electronic instrument capable of producing sounds by generating electrical signals of different frequencies. These electrical signals are played through a loudspeaker or set of headphones. Synthesizers can usually produce a wide range of sounds, which may either imitate other instruments ("imitative synthesis") or generate new timbres. The first electric synthesizer was invented in 1876 by Elisha Gray who accidentally discovered that he could control sound from a self vibrating electromagnetic circuit and in doing so, invented a basic single note oscillator. This musical telegraph used steel reeds whose oscillations were created and transmitted, over a telephone line, by electromagnets. Gray also built a simple loudspeaker device in later models consisting of a vibrating diaphragm in a magnetic field to make the oscillator audible.

1876 Airbrush

- An airbrush is a small, air-operated tool that sprays various media including ink and dye, but most often paint by a process of nebulization. Spray guns developed from the airbrush and are still considered a type of airbrush. The first airbrush was invented in 1876 by Francis Edgar Stanley of Newton, Massachusetts.

1876 Tattoo machine

- A tattoo machine is a hand-held device generally used to create a tattoo, a permanent marking of the skin with ink. The basic machine, which was called Stencil-Pens, was invented by Thomas Alva Edison and patented in the United States in 1876. It was originally intended to be used as an engraving device, but Samuel O'Reilly discovered that Edison's machine could be modified and used to introduce ink into the skin, and later patented it as a tattooing machine in 1891.

1877 Phonograph

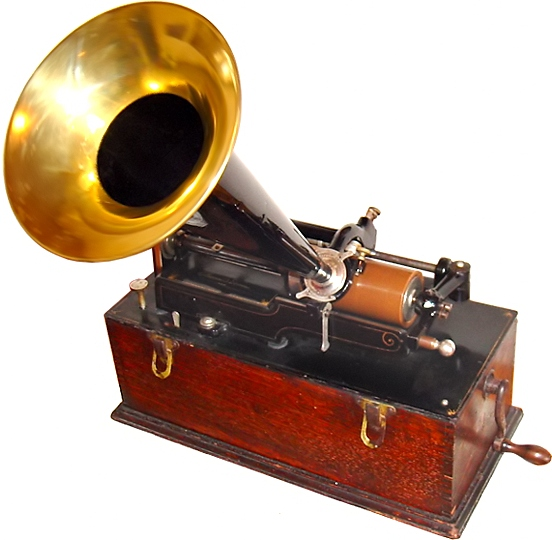
Thomas Edison's talking machine

The phonograph, record player or gramophone is an instrument for recording, reproducing and playing back sounds. The earliest phonographs used cylinders containing an audio recording engraved on the outside surface which could be reproduced when the cylinder was played. Later, the gramophone record with modulated spiral grooves set atop a rotating turntable. The phonograph was invented in 1877 by Thomas Alva Edison at his laboratory in Menlo Park, New Jersey. On February 8, 1878, Edison was issued the first patent (U.S. patent #200,521) for the phonograph.

1877 District heating

District heating distributes heat generated in a centralized location for residential and commercial heating requirements. The heat is often obtained from a cogeneration plant burning fossil fuels but increasingly biomass, although heat-only boiler stations, geothermal heating and central solar heating are also used, as well as nuclear power. A system was built in France in the 14th century and the United States Naval Academy in Annapolis, Maryland began steam district heating service in 1853. However, the first commercially successful district heating system was launched in Lockport, New York, in 1877 by American hydraulic engineer Birdsill Holly, considered the founder of modern district heating.

== Gilded Age (1878–1899) ==
1878 Carbon microphone

- The carbon microphone is a sound-to-electrical signal transducer consisting of two metal plates separated by granules of carbon. When sound waves strike this plate, the pressure on the granules changes, which in turn changes the electrical resistance between the plates. A direct current is passed from one plate to the other, and the changing resistance results in a changing current, which can be passed through a telephone system, or used in other ways in electronics systems to change the sound into an electrical signal. After a lengthy court battle over patent rights filed in 1877, a United States federal court as well as a British court in 1878 ruled in favor of Thomas Alva Edison over a claim held by Emile Berliner since Edison indisputably preceded Berliner in inventing the transmission of speech as well as the use of carbon in a transmitter.

1878 Free jet water turbine

- A free jet water turbine or impulse water turbine, also commonly known as a Pelton's wheel, is a wheel that uses cups, or buckets, that are split down the middle by a metal divider, so that in effect two cups are mounted side by side at each "spoke" in the wheel. A high-pressure water jet aimed at the center of each bucket is split by the divider to hit each of cup, one on the left, the other on the right. The design of this water turbine takes advantage of a mechanics principle known as impulse, a force defined as the product of the force and the time during which it acts. In 1878, Lester Pelton invented his prototype known as the Pelton's wheel, first demonstrating it to miners in the Sierra Nevada. In 1880, Lester Pelton received a patent for his invention.

1878 Bolometer

- A bolometer measures the energy of incident electromagnetic radiation. It was invented in 1878 by American astronomer Samuel Pierpont Langley.

1879 mechanical production of Photographic plate

- Photographic plates preceded photographic film as a means of photography. A light-sensitive emulsion of silver salts was applied to a glass plate. This form of photographic material largely faded from the consumer market in the early years of the 20th century, as more convenient and less fragile films were introduced. The wet collodion process was replaced by dry plates at the start of the 1870s. The mechanical production of dry photographic plates were invented by George Eastman who filed U.S. patent #226,503 on September 9, 1879, for (in his own words "An Improved Process for Preparing Gelatine Dry-Film Plates") which was issued to him on April 13, 1880.

1879 Carton

- A carton is the name of certain types of containers typically made from paperboard or cardboard. Many types of cartons are used in food packaging. Sometimes a carton is also called a box. The history of the carton goes as far back as 1879 when it was invented in a Brooklyn, New York factory. The inventor of the folded carton was Robert Gair. He cast a die-ruled, cut, and scored paperboard into a single impression of a folded carton. By 1896, the National Biscuit Company was the first to use cartons to package crackers.

1879 Cash register

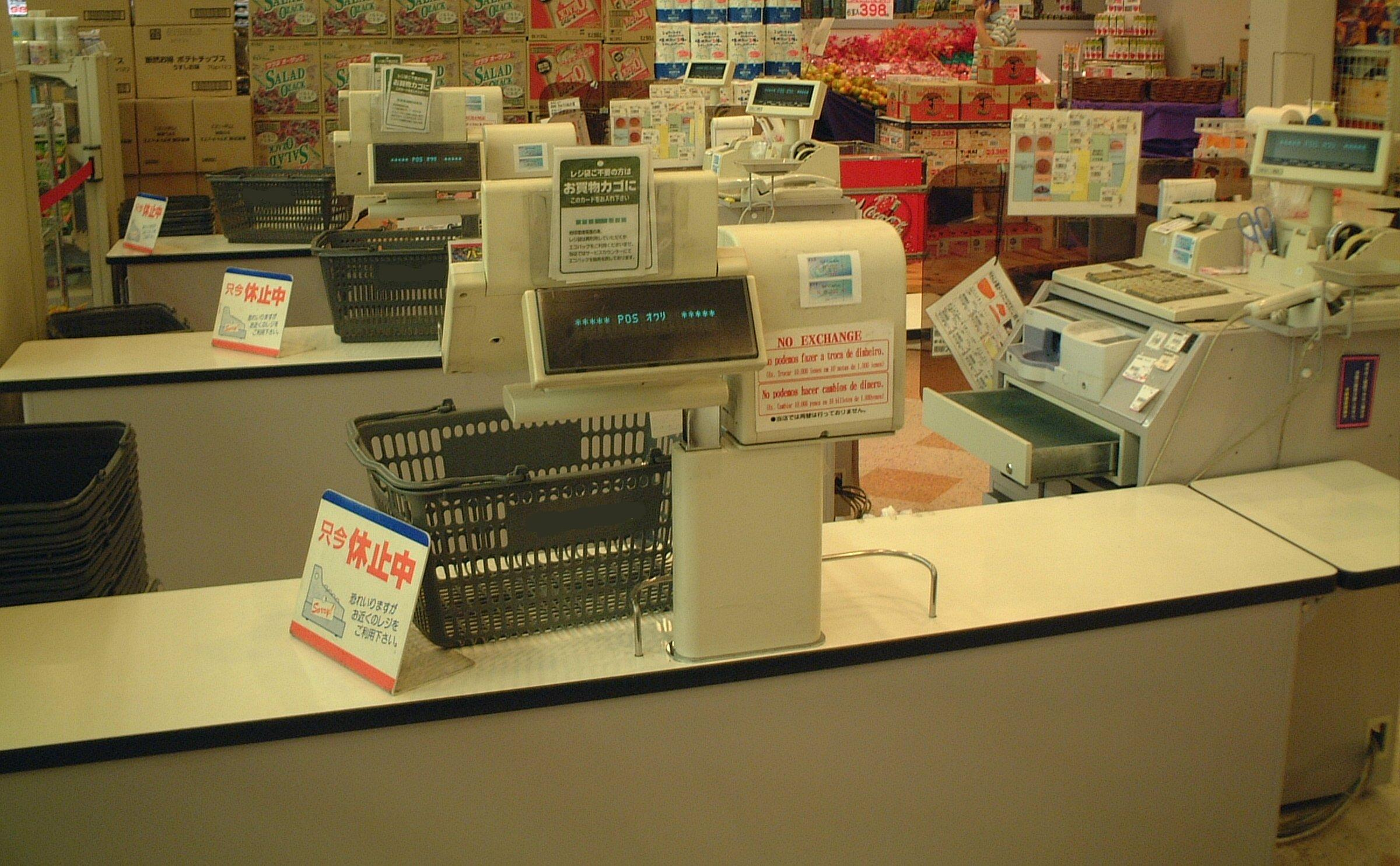
An example of a cash register in Japan

The cash register is a device for calculating and recording sales transactions. When a transaction was completed, the first cash registers used a bell that rang and the amount was noted on a large dial on the front of the machine. During each sale, a paper tape was punched with holes so that the merchant could keep track of sales. Known as the "Incorruptible Cashier", the mechanical cash register was invented and patented in 1879 by James Ritty of Dayton, Ohio. John H. Patterson bought Ritty's patent and his cash register company in 1884.

1880 Oil burner

An oil burner is a heating device which burns fuel oil. The oil is directed under pressure through a nozzle to produce a fine spray, which is usually ignited by an electric spark with the air being forced through by an electric fan. In 1880, Amanda Jones invented the oil burner in the oil fields of northern Pennsylvania where Jones completed her trial and error efforts of heating furnaces.

1880 Candlepin bowling

Candlepin bowling is a North American variation of bowling that is played primarily in the Canadian Maritime provinces, Quebec, Maine, Massachusetts, and New Hampshire. A candlepin bowling lane somewhat resembles lanes used in tenpin bowling. However, unlike tenpin bowling lanes that are flat, candlepin lanes are slightly depressed ahead of the pindeck. The candlepins themselves take on a cylindrical shape which are tapered at the tops and bottoms, thus giving them a resemblance to wax candles. In 1880, candlepin bowling was invented by Justin White of Worcester, Massachusetts.

1881 Electric chair

- Execution by electrocution is an execution method which the person being put to death is strapped to a specially built wooden chair and electrocuted through electrodes placed on the body. In 1881, Buffalo, New York dentist and inventor Alfred Southwick heard about an intoxicated man dying instantly after touching a live electric generator. Dr. Southwick concluded that electricity could be used as an alternative to hanging for executions. Southwick's dental work meant he was accustomed to performing procedures on subjects in chairs, and so he designed an "electric chair". It took nine years of development and legislation before the first person was executed via the electric chair, William Kemmler in New York's Auburn Prison on August 6, 1890.

1881 Metal detector

- Metal detectors use electromagnetic induction to detect metal. In 1881, the Scots-American named Alexander Graham Bell invented the first metal detector as President James Garfield lay dying from a fatal gunshot wound. Despite an effort to locate the lodged bullet, Bell's invention proved to be unsuccessful as the metal detector was confused by the metal-framed bed which the assassinated president laid on.

1881 Iron (electric)

- An iron is a small appliance used to remove wrinkles from fabric. The electric iron was invented in 1881 and patented in 1882 by Henry W. Seely of New York. A second electric iron, a "cordless" one instead heated on a stand powered by electricity, was developed with his partner Dyer in 1883.

1881 peristaltic pump
A peristaltic pump was first patented in the United States by Eugene Allen in 1881 (U.S. Patent number 249285) for the transfusion of blood.

1882 Fan (electric)

- An electric fan contains an arrangement of blades usually powered by an electric motor in order to produce airflow for the purpose of creating comfort (particularly in the heat), ventilation, or exhaust. Between the years 1882 and 1886, New Orleans resident Schuyler Skaats Wheeler invented the first electric fan.

1883 Salt water taffy

- Salt water taffy is a variety of soft taffy. Despite the name, it does not contain sea water. The legend of how salt water taffy got its name is disputed. The most popular story, although unconfirmed, concerns a candy-store owner, David Bradley, whose shop was flooded during a major storm in 1883. His entire stock of taffy was soaked with salty Atlantic Ocean water. When a young girl came into his shop and asked if he had any taffy for sale, he is said to have offered some "salt water taffy". At the time it was a joke, because all his taffy had been soaked with salt water, but the girl was delighted, she bought the candy and proudly walked down to the beach to show her friends. Bradley's mother was in the back and heard the exchange. She loved the name and so Salt Water Taffy was born.

1883 Solar cell

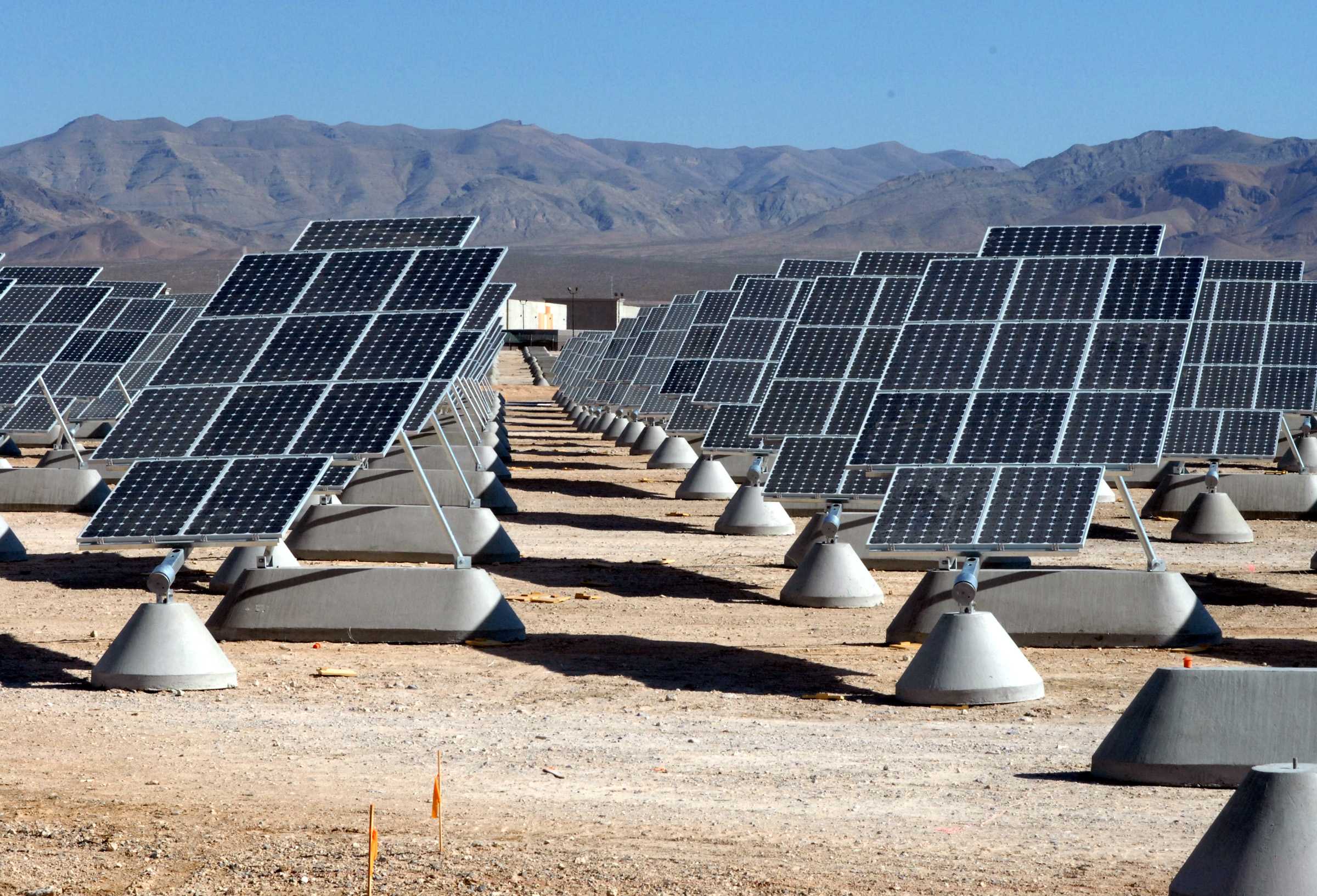
Solar panels at Nellis Air Force Base in Nevada generating and absorbing the sun's natural light

A solar cell is any device that directly converts the energy in light into electrical energy through the process of photovoltaics. Although French physicist Antoine-César Becquerel discovered the photovoltaic effect much earlier in 1839, the first solar cell, according to Encyclopædia Britannica, was invented by Charles Fritts in 1883, who used junctions formed by coating selenium with an extremely thin layer of gold. In 1941, the silicon solar cell was invented by another American named Russell Ohl. Drawing upon Ohl's work, three American researchers named Gerald Pearson, Calvin Fuller, and Daryl Chapin essentially introduced the first practical use of solar panels through their improvement of the silicone solar cell in 1954, which by placing them in direct sunlight, free electrons are turned into electric current enabling a six percent energy conversion efficiency.

1883 Thermostat

A thermostat is a device for regulating the temperature of a system so that the system's temperature is maintained near a desired setpoint temperature. The thermostat does this by switching heating or cooling devices on or off, or regulating the flow of a heat transfer fluid as needed, to maintain the correct temperature. The thermostat was invented in 1883 by Warren S. Johnson.

1884 Machine gun

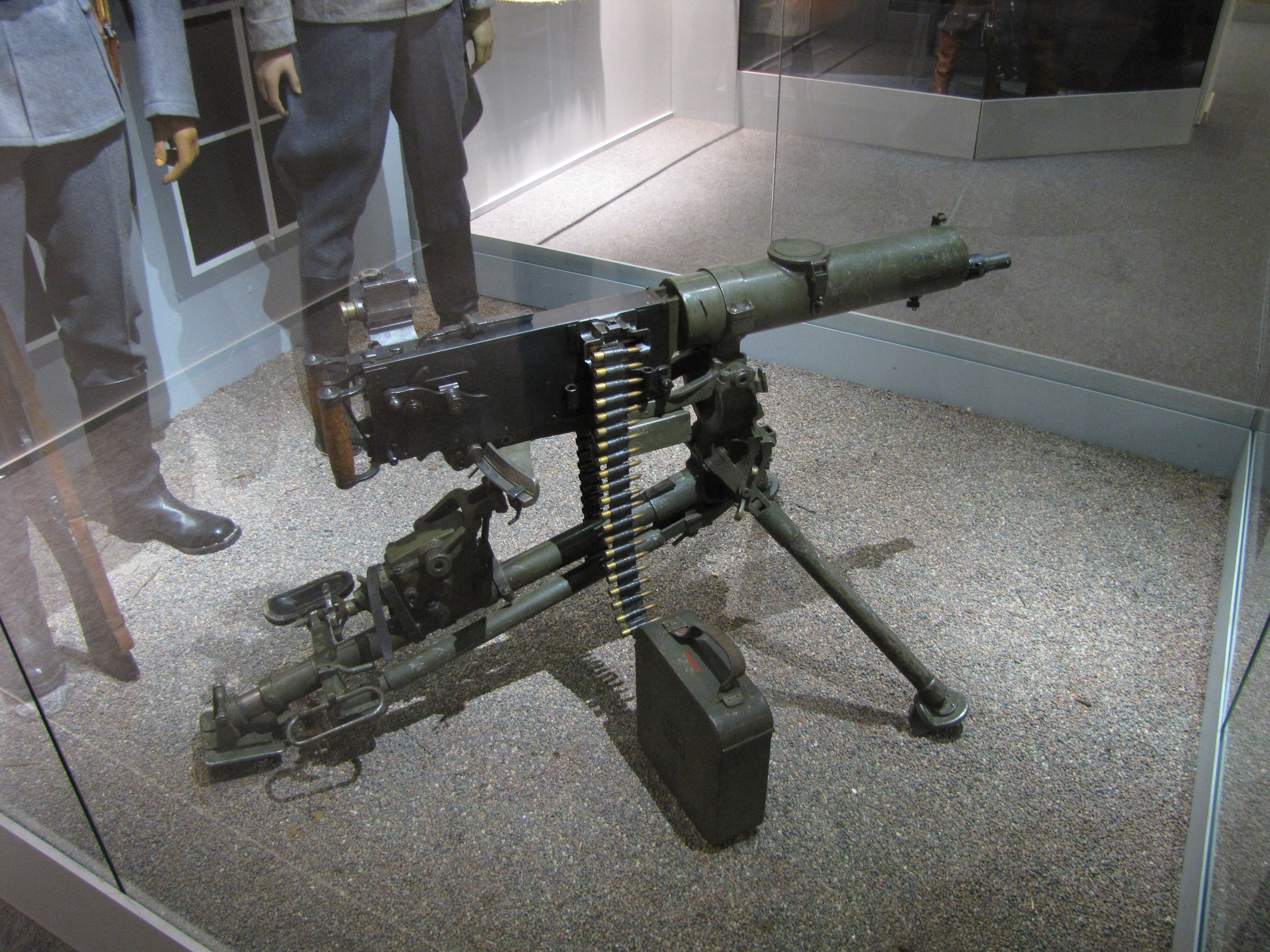
Maxim's machine gun on display at the Military Museum of Finland

The machine gun is defined as a fully automatic firearm, usually designed to fire rifle cartridges in quick succession from an ammunition belt or large-capacity magazine. The world's first true machine gun, the Maxim gun, was invented in 1884 by the American inventor Hiram Stevens Maxim, who devised a recoil power of the previously fired bullet to reload rather than the crude method of a manually operated, hand-cranked firearm. With the ability to fire 750 rounds per minute, Maxim's other great innovation was the use of water cooling to reduce overheating. Maxim's gun was widely adopted and derivative designs were used on all sides during World War I.

1884 Dissolvable pill

A dissolvable pill is any pharmaceutical in tablet form that is ingested orally, which are crushable and able to dissolve in the stomach unlike tablets with hard coatings. The dissolvable pill was invented in 1884 by William E. Upjohn.

1884 Skyscraper

A skyscraper is a tall building that uses a steel-frame construction. After the Great Fire of 1871, Chicago had become a magnet for daring experiments in architecture as one of those was the birth of the skyscraper. The edifice known as the world's first skyscraper was the 10-story Home Insurance Company Building built in 1884. It was designed by the Massachusetts-born architect William Le Baron Jenney.

1885 Popcorn machine

- A popcorn machine, also called a popcorn maker, is a device used to pop popcorn. Commercial popcorn machines are usually found in movie theaters and carnivals, producing popcorn of the oil-popped type, which has approximately 45% of its calories derived from fat. The first commercial popcorn machine was invented by Chicago resident Charles Cretors in 1885. His business that he founded, C. Cretors & Company, still to this day manufactures popcorn machines and other specialty equipment.

1885 Photographic film

- Photographic film is a sheet of material coated with a photosensitive emulsion. When the emulsion is sufficiently exposed to light or other forms of electromagnetic radiation such as X-rays and is developed it forms an image. George Eastman and his company, Eastman Kodak, invented the first flexible photographic film as well as the invention of roll film in 1885. This original "film" used a paper carrier. The first transparent plastic film was produced in 1889. Before this, glass photographic plates were used, which were far more expensive and cumbersome, although of better quality due to their size. Early film was made from flammable nitrocellulose with camphor as a plasticizer.

1885 Mixer (cooking)

- An electric mixer is a kitchen appliance used for whipping, beating, and folding food ingredients. It typically consists of a handle mounted over a large enclosure containing the motor, which drives one or two beaters. The beaters are immersed in the food to be mixed. The first electric mixer was invented by Rufus M. Eastman in 1885. U.S. patent #330,829 for the first electric mixer was filed by Eastman on March 6, 1885, and issued on November 17, 1885.

1885 Fuel dispenser

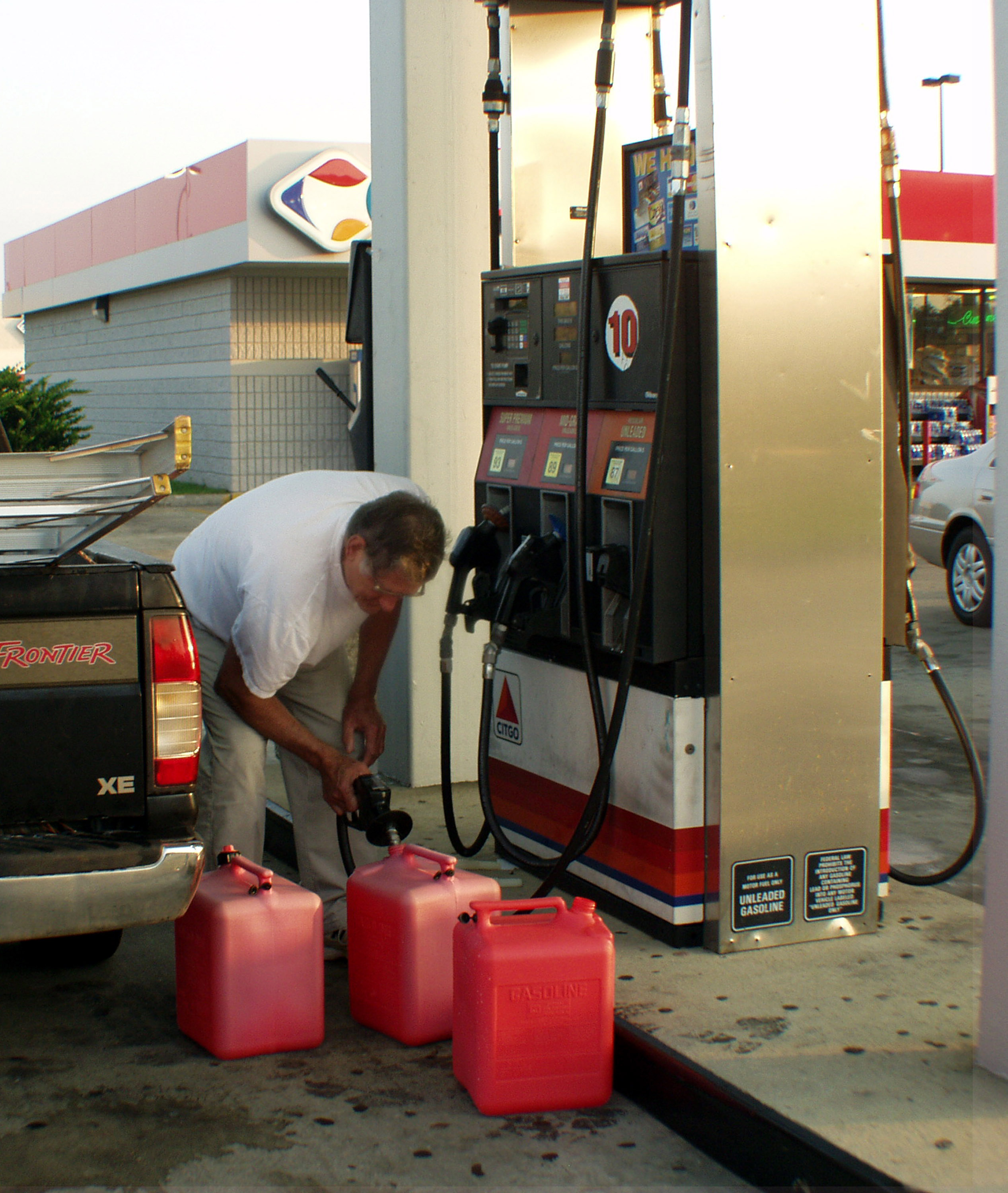
A man using a fuel dispenser by pumping gasoline into plastic fuel containers

A fuel dispenser is used to pump gasoline, diesel, or other types of fuel into vehicles or containers. As the automobile was not invented yet, the gas pump was used for kerosene lamps and stoves. Sylvanus F. Bowser of Fort Wayne, Indiana invented the gasoline/petrol pump on September 5, 1885. Coincidentally, the term "bowser" is still often used in countries such as New Zealand and Australia as a reference to the fuel dispenser.

1886 Filing cabinet (horizontal)

A filing cabinet is a piece of office furniture used to store paper documents in file folders. It is an enclosure for drawers in which items are stored. On November 2, 1886, Henry Brown patented his invention of a "receptacle for storing and preserving papers". This was a fire- and accident-safe container made of forged metal, which could be sealed with a lock and key. It was special in that it kept the papers separated.

1886 Telephone directory

A telephone directory is a listing of telephone subscribers in a geographical area or subscribers to services provided by the organization that publishes the directory. R. H. Donnelley created the first official telephone directory which was referred to as the Yellow Pages in 1886.

1887 Screen door

A screen door can refer to a hinged storm door (cold climates) or hinged screen door (warm climates) covering an exterior door; or a screened sliding door used with sliding glass doors. In any case, the screen door incorporates screen mesh to block flying insects from entering and pets and small children from exiting interior spaces, while allowing for air, light, and views. The screen door was invented in 1887 by Hannah Harger.

1887 Gramophone record

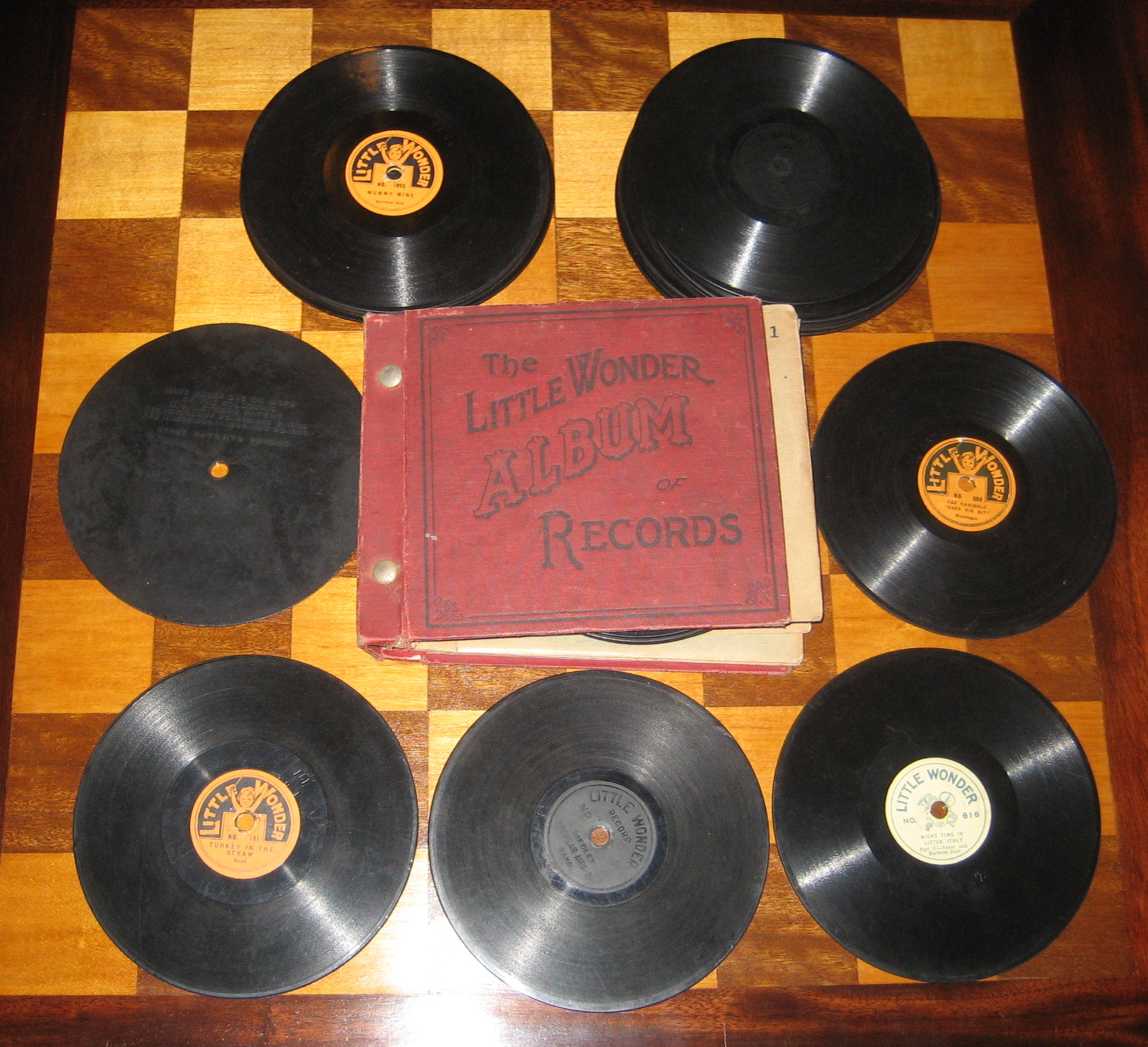
A selection of gramophone records and an album

A gramophone record, commonly known as a record, vinyl record, or phonograph record, is an analog sound storage medium consisting of a flat disc with an inscribed, modulated spiral groove. The groove usually starts near the periphery and ends near the center of the disc. Ever since Thomas Edison invented the phonograph in 1877, it produced distorted sound because of gravity's pressure on the playing stylus. In response, Emile Berliner invented a new medium for recording and listening to sound in 1887 in the form of a horizontal disc, originally known as the "platter".

1887 Slot machine

A slot machine is a casino gambling machine. Due to the vast number of possible wins with the original poker card based game, it proved practically impossible to come up with a way to make a machine capable of making an automatic pay-out for all possible winning combinations. The first "one-armed bandit" was invented in 1887 by Charles Fey of San Francisco, California who devised a simple automatic mechanism with three spinning reels containing a total of five symbols – horseshoes, diamonds, spades, hearts and a Liberty Bell, which also gave the machine its name.

1887 Softball

As a bat-and-ball team sport, softball is a variant of baseball. The difference between the two sports is that softball uses larger balls and requires a smaller playing field. Beginning as an indoor game in Chicago, softball was invented in 1887 by George Hancock.

1887 Comptometer

- A comptometer is a mechanical or electro-mechanical adding machine. The comptometer was the first adding device to be driven solely by the action of pressing keys, which are arranged in an array of vertical and horizontal columns. Although the comptometer was designed primarily for adding, it could also do division, multiplication, and subtraction. Special comptometers with varying key arrays were produced for a variety of purposes, including calculating currencies, time and Imperial measures of weight. The original design was invented and patented in 1887 by Dorr Felt.

1888 Induction motor

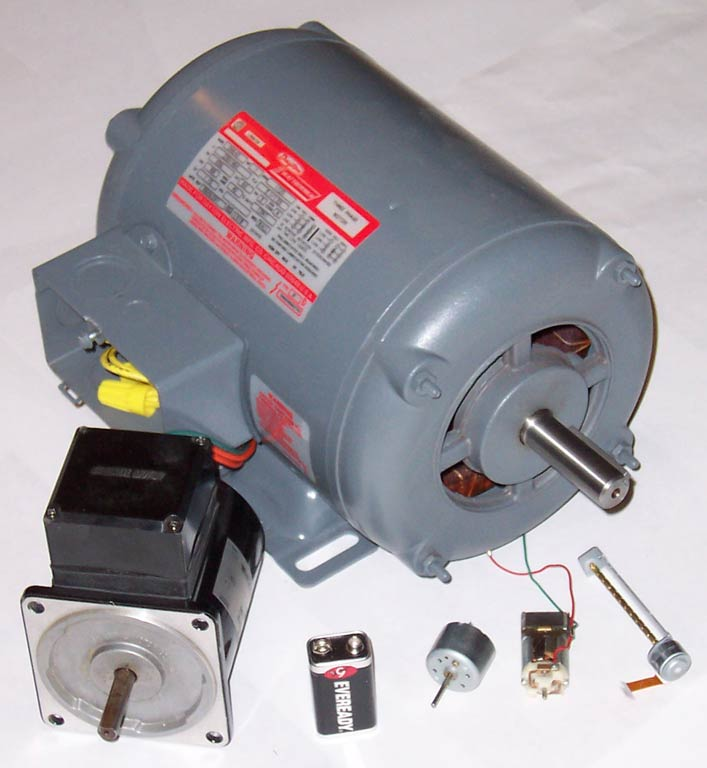
Examples of modern induction motors

An induction motor is an AC electric motor in which the electric current in the rotor needed to produce torque is induced by electromagnetic induction from the magnetic field of the stator winding instead of using mechanical commutation (brushes) that caused sparking in earlier electric motors. They are also self-starting. The Serbian-American inventor Nikola Tesla explored the idea of using a rotating magnetic induction field principle, using it in his invention of a poly-phase induction motor using alternating current which he received a patent for on May 1, 1888. The rights to Tesla's invention were licensed by George Westinghouse for the AC power system his company was developing.

The induction motor Tesla patented in the U.S. is considered to have been an independent invention since the Europe Italian physicist Galileo Ferraris published a paper on a rotating magnetic field based induction motor on 11 March 1888, almost two months before Tesla was granted his patent. A working model of the Ferraris induction motor may have been demonstrated at the University of Turin as early as 1885.

1888 Kinetoscope

The Kinetoscope was an early motion picture exhibition device. It was designed for films to be viewed individually through the window of a cabinet housing its components. The Kinetoscope introduced the basic approach that would become the standard for all cinematic projection before the advent of video, creating the illusion of movement by conveying a strip of perforated film bearing sequential images over a light source with a high-speed shutter. First described in conceptual terms by Thomas Alva Edison in 1888, his invention was largely developed by one of his assistants, William Kennedy Laurie Dickson, between 1889 and 1892.

1888 Trolley pole

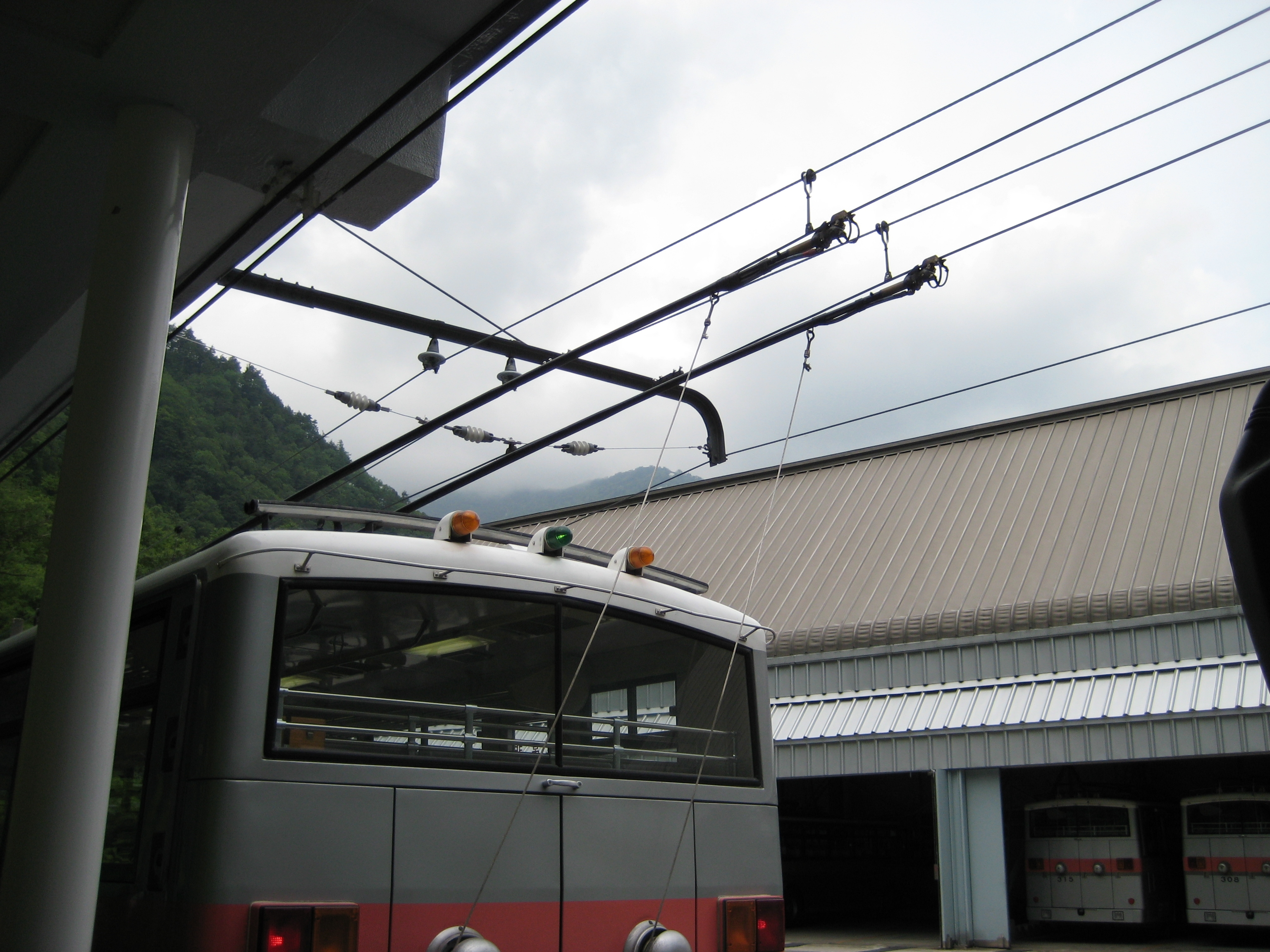
An example of a trolley pole used in Japan

A trolley pole is a tapered cylindrical pole of wood or metal placed in contact with an overhead wire to provide electricity to the trolley car. The trolley pole sits atop a sprung base on the roof of the trolley vehicle, the springs maintaining the tension to keep the trolley wheel or shoe in contact with the wire. Occasionally, a Canadian named John Joseph Wright is credited with inventing the trolley pole when an experimental tramway in Toronto, Ontario, was built in 1883. While Wright may have assisted in the installation of railways at the Canadian National Exhibition (CNE), and may even have used a pole system, there is no hard evidence to prove it. Likewise, Wright never filed or was issued a patent. Official credit for the invention of the electric trolley pole has gone to an American, Frank J. Sprague, who devised his working system in Richmond, Virginia, in 1888. Known as the Richmond Union Passenger Railway, this 12-mile system was the first large-scale trolley line in the world, opening to great fanfare on February 12, 1888.

1888 Drinking straw

The drinking straw is a tube used for transferring a liquid to the mouth, usually a drink from one location to another. The first crude forms of drinking straws were made of dry, hollow, rye grass. Marvin Stone is the inventor of the drinking straw. Stone, who worked in a factory that made paper cigarette holders, did not like this design because it made beverages taste like grass. As an alternative, on January 3, 1888, Stone got a piece of paper from his factory and wrapped it around a pencil. By coating it with wax, his drinking straw became leak-proof so that it would not get waterlogged.

1888 Stepping switch

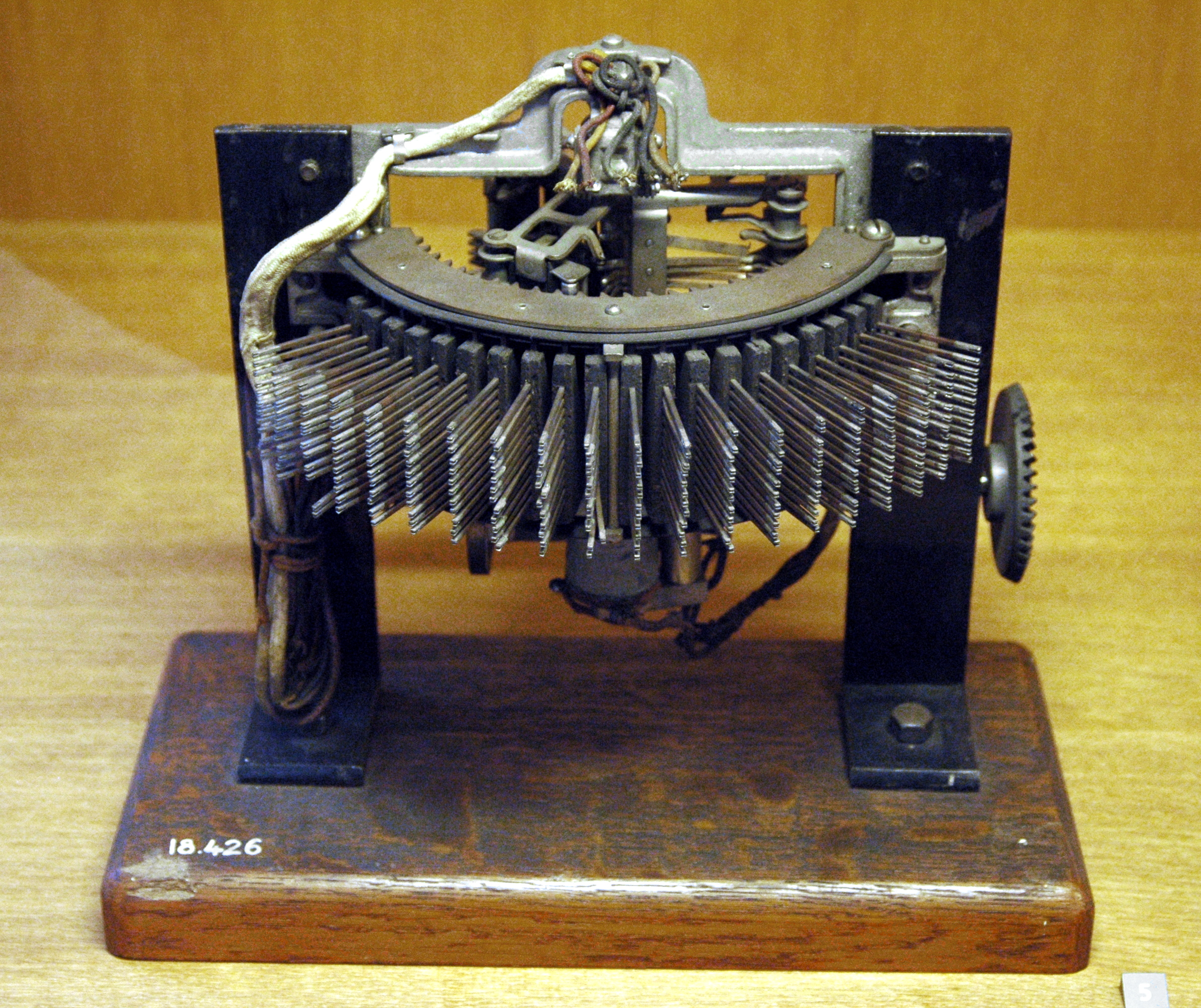
An example of a Strowger-type selector assembly

In electrical controls, a stepping switch, also known as a stepping relay, is an electromechanical device which allows an input connection to be connected to one of a number of possible output connections, under the control of a series of electrical pulses. The major use for these devices was in early automatic telephone exchanges to route telephone calls. It can step on one axis (called a uniselector), or on two axes (a Strowger switch). As the first automated telephone switch using electromagnets and hat pins, stepping switches were invented by Almon Brown Strowger in 1888. Strowger filed his patent application on March 12, 1889, and it was issued on March 10, 1891.

1888 Revolving door

A revolving door has three or four doors that hang on a center shaft and rotate around a vertical axis within a round enclosure. In high-rise buildings, regular doors are hard to open because of air pressure differentials. In order to address this problem, the revolving door was invented in 1888 by Theophilus Van Kannel of Philadelphia, Pennsylvania. Van Kannel patented the revolving door on August 7, 1888.

1888 Ballpoint pen

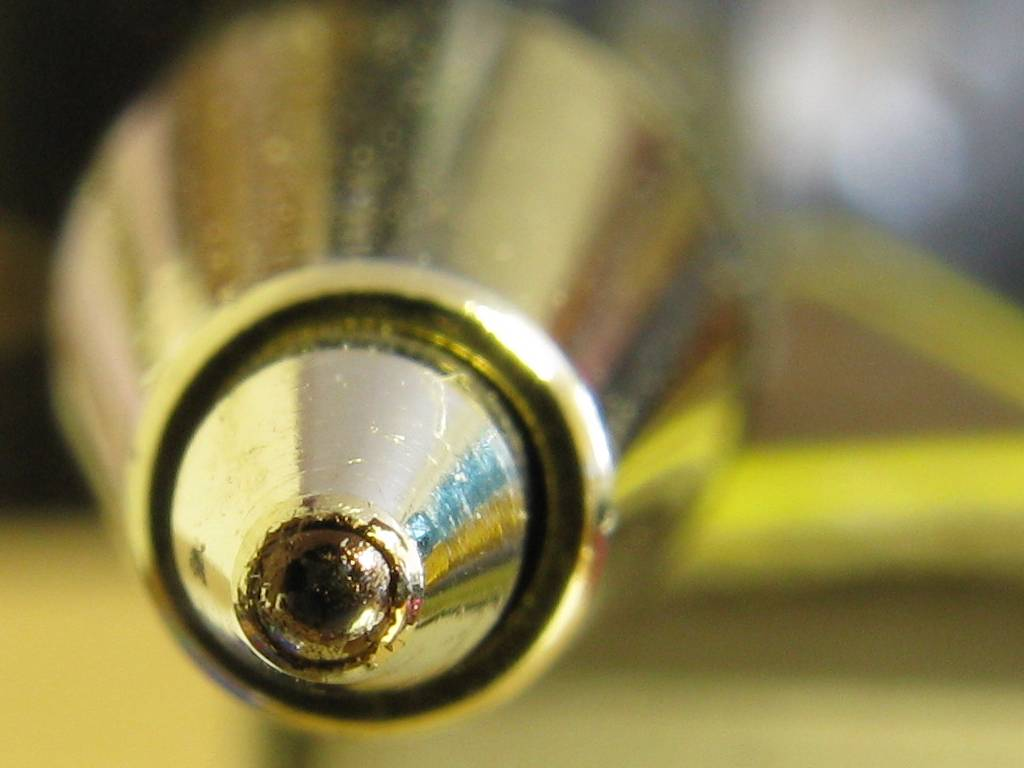
The tip of a ballpoint pen

A ballpoint pen is a writing instrument with an internal ink reservoir and a sphere for a point. The internal chamber is filled with a viscous ink that is dispensed at its tip during use by the rolling action of a small sphere. The first ballpoint pen is the creation of American leather tanner John Loud of Weymouth, Massachusetts in 1888 which contained a reservoir for ink and a roller ball to mark up his leather hides. Despite Loud being the inventor of the ballpoint pen, it wasn't a practical success since the ink often leaked or clogged up. Loud took out a patent (British patent #15630) in the United Kingdom on October 30, 1888. However, it wasn't until 1935 when Hungarian newspaper editor László Bíró offered an improved version of the ballpoint pen that left paper smudge-free.

1888 Telautograph

The telautograph, an analog precursor to the modern fax machine, transmits electrical impulses recorded by potentiometers at the sending station to stepping motors attached to a pen at the receiving station, thus reproducing at the receiving station a drawing or signature made by sender. It was the first such device to transmit drawings to a stationary sheet of paper. The telautograph's invention is attributed to Elisha Gray, who patented it in 1888.

1888 Touch typing

- Touch typing is typing on a keyboard without using the sense of sight to find the keys. Specifically, a touch typist will know their location on the keyboard through muscle memory. Touch typing typically involves placing the eight fingers in a horizontal row along the middle of the keyboard (the home row) and having them reach for other keys. Touch typing was invented in 1888 by Frank E. McGurrin, a court stenographer from Salt Lake City, Utah.

1888 Salisbury steak

- Salisbury steak is a dish made from a blend of minced beef and other ingredients, which is shaped to resemble a steak, and is usually served with gravy or brown sauce. The Salisbury steak was invented in 1888 by American doctor and chemist James Salisbury, who prescribed his "meat cure" for such ailments like rheumatism, gout, colitis, and anemia.

1889 Flexible flyer

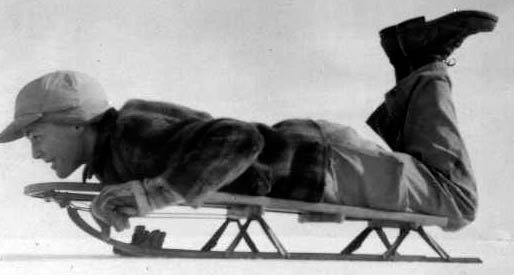
A boy atop a flexible flyer sled in 1945

A flexible flyer or steel runner sled is a steerable wooden sled with thin metal runners whereby a rider may sit upright on the sled or lie on their stomach, allowing the possibility to descend a snowy slope feet-first or head-first. To steer the sled, the rider may either push on the wooden cross piece with their hands or feet, or pull on the rope attached to the wooden cross-piece. The flexible flyer was invented in 1889 by Philadelphia resident Samuel Leeds Allen. U.S. patent #408,681 was issued to Allen on August 13, 1889.

1889 Payphone

A payphone or pay phone is a public telephone, usually located in a stand-alone upright container such as a phone booth, with payment done by inserting money (usually coins), a credit or debit card, or a telephone card before the call is made. Pay telephone stations preceded the invention of the pay phone and existed as early as 1878. These stations were supervised by telephone company attendants or agents who collected the money due after people made their calls. In 1889, the first coin-operated telephone was installed by inventor William Gray at a bank in Hartford, Connecticut. However, it was a "postpay" machine that only accepted coins deposited after the call was placed.

== See also ==
Timelines of United States inventions

- Timeline of United States inventions (1890–1945)
- Timeline of United States inventions (after 1991)

Related topics

- History of United States patent law
- Lemelson Foundation
- Lemelson–MIT Prize
- List of African American inventors and scientists
- List of Puerto Ricans
- List of inventors
- List of inventors killed by their own inventions
- List of prolific inventors
- List of Puerto Ricans in the United States Space Program
- Military invention
- NASA spinoff
- National Inventors Hall of Fame
- Native American contributions
- Science and technology in the United States
- Technological and industrial history of the United States
- Timeline of United States discoveries
- United States Patent and Trademark Office
- United States patent law
- Yankee ingenuity
