= Valpak =

North American direct marketing company

Valpak Direct Marketing Systems, LLC
- Company type: Subsidiary
- Industry: Direct marketing
- Founded: 1968; 58 years ago
- Headquarters: St. Petersburg, Florida, U.S.
- Area served: United States
- Products: Coupons, advertising postcards, customer data
- Parent: AmatoMartin

Valpak Direct Marketing Systems, LLC, commonly known as Valpak, is a North American direct marketing company owned by AmatoMartin. Valpak provides print, mobile and online advertising, customer data and coupons. Valpak mails coupons to 41 million demographically targeted households each month and millions more consumers through its advertising postcards and website every year.

== History ==
Terry Loebel, an unemployed autoworker, founded Valpak in 1968, using a $500 loan to start mailing coupons from his home to households in Clearwater, Florida. In 1972, Valpak established its first franchise in Orlando, Florida. A group of investors purchased Valpak from Terry Loebel in 1985.

In September 1991, Cox Target Media, Inc. purchased Valpak and by 1997, Valpak was mailing out 11 billion coupons a year. In 2005, Valpak opened a St. Petersburg, Florida headquarters with 50,000-square-foot space and had 310 employees. In January 2017, Platinum Equity acquired Valpak from Cox Target Media, Inc. In November 2023, AmatoMartin acquired Valpak from Platinum Equity.

== Products ==
=== Coupon envelopes ===
Valpak prints, packages and ships coupon envelopes from the Valpak Manufacturing Center, a $200-million, 500,000-square-foot print production facility in St. Petersburg. Print inserts in the envelope advertise local businesses and national brands with coupons for dining, health and beauty, entertainment, automotive, home services and more.

In each of its mailing cycles, Valpak sells the outside of its envelope to select national advertisers for promotions, marketing campaigns and sweepstakes. Advertisers include Tennis Channel, HGTV, Legoland, Shutterfly and Panera Bread.

=== Advertising postcards ===
In October 2019, Valpak partnered with the United States Postal Service on a 2-year test of Plus One postcards. These postcards became a permanent USPS product in January 2022. Valpak also provides an automated postcard service to audiences like new movers as well as other targeted and saturation postcard products.
