= William H. "Dad" Martin =

American photographer

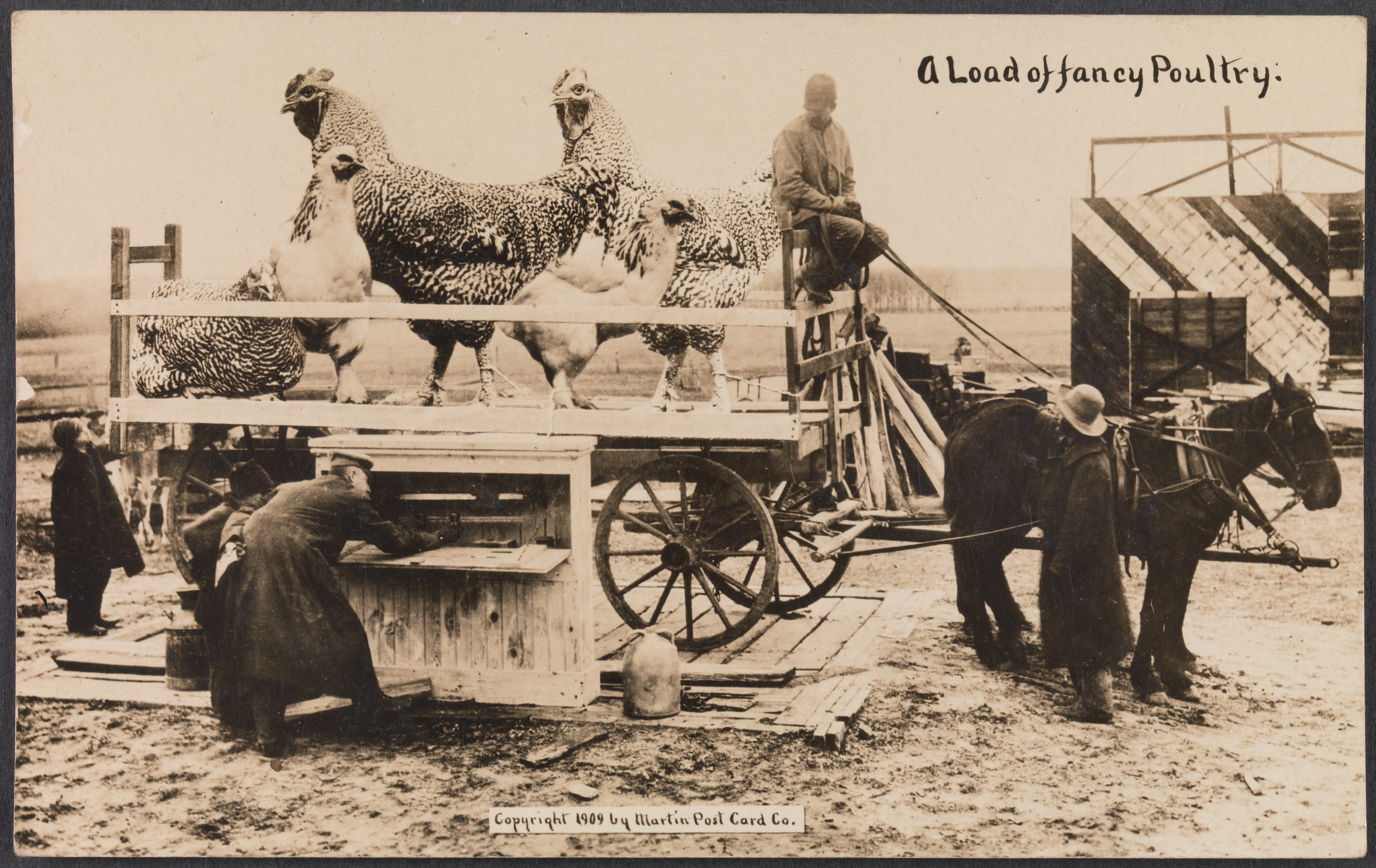
A Load of Fancy Poultry, published by Martin in 1909

William H. Martin, (1865–c. 1940) also known by the nickname "Dad Martin", was an American photographer and postcard designer known for using photomontage to depict exaggerated scenes with out-of-scale plants and animals. His works featured fanciful depictions of the American frontier inspired by tall tales. His depictions of abundant crops and large livestock served to humorously parody the struggles of farmers in the Midwestern United States who faced drought. They also mocked the exaggerated promises of fertile land and abundant livestock that companies used to lure settlers to the West. Martin was a pioneer of the art form of collage in the United States, and is considered to be the "father" of the exaggeration postcard genre.

Martin was originally from Maple City, Kansas, and was born in 1865. When he was 21 years old, he moved to Ottawa, Kansas, to study under the photographer E.H. Corwin. He had no prior experience in photography. He proved successful, and bought Corwin's photography studio in 1894.

He used photomontage and trick photography and, in 1908, began producing wildly exaggerated postcards for commercial sale. His cards typically featured out-of-scale scenes with people alongside giant plants and animals, created by cutting and pasting together different photographs. His postcards were popular with Western settlers, who sent them back to their families in the Eastern United States. His business was successful, and by 1909 he had built a two-story business building behind his home and employed around 20 people, who produced around 10,000 postcards every day. His photographs proved so popular that they were often plagiarized by other postcard companies and sold under different names.

In 1912, Martin sold his company to Williams S. Fallis and William H. Jones, who relocated the business to Kansas City, Missouri and renamed it to the North American Post Card Company. Martin then founded another company, the National Sign Company. He fell into obscurity after selling his postcard company, and he eventually died c. 1940.
