= Judges Postcards =

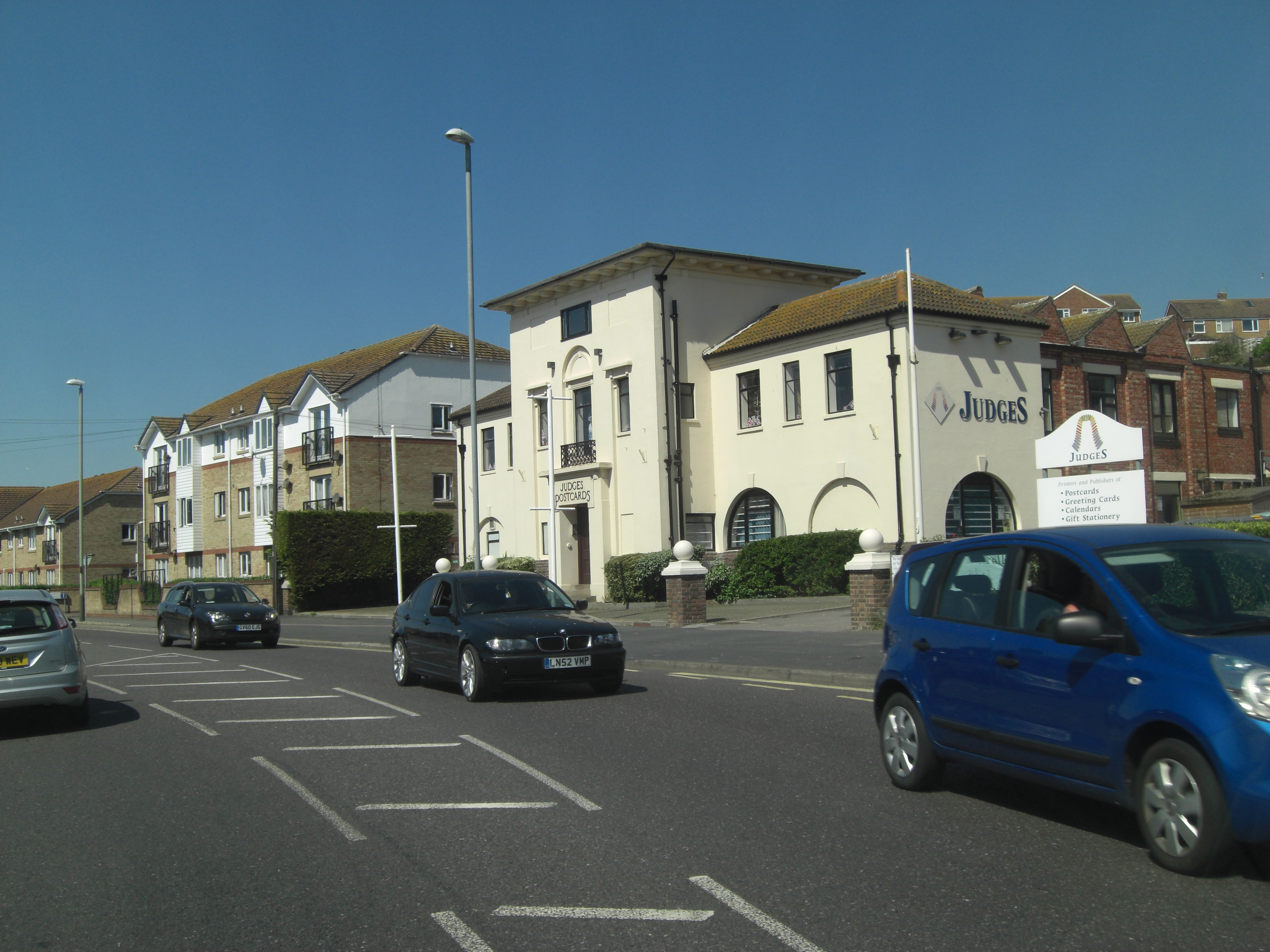
Judges Postcards in St Leonards-on-Sea, East Sussex

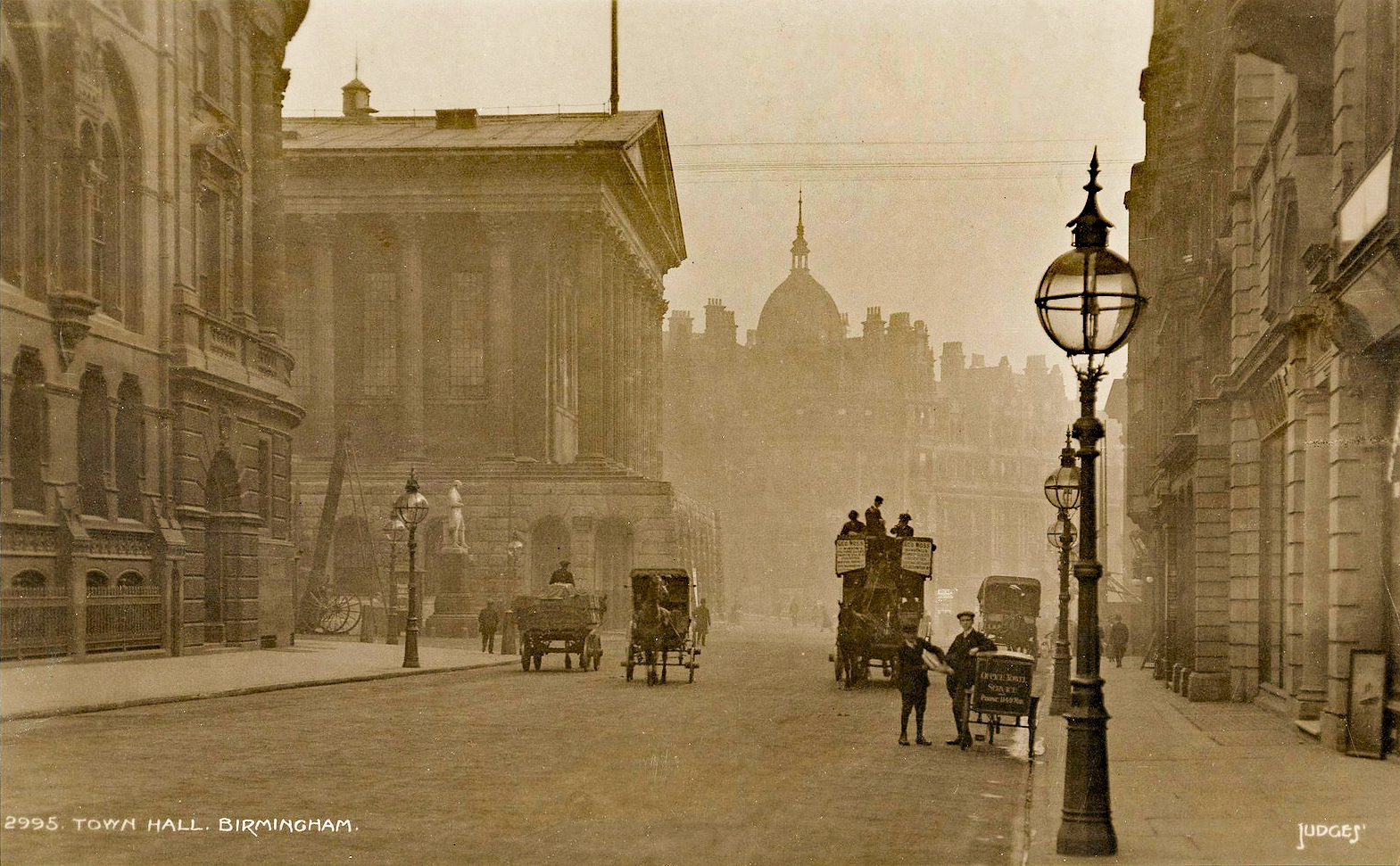
The Town Hall, Birmingham, UK. A Judges' Postcard

Judges Postcards is a picture postcard manufacturer based in St Leonards-on-Sea, East Sussex, first produced by Fred Judge in 1903. It was known as Judges Limited between 1910 and 1984.

== Fred Judge ==
Fred Judge (11 June 1872 – 23 February 1950) was an English photographer of all parts of the British Isles and founder of the company. Judge was born at Old Market Place, Wakefield, the son of Joseph Judge, a corn dealer, and Harriet Judge (née Waldron).

Judge moved from Wakefield in 1902 and purchased Algernon Booker’s photographic business at 21A Wellington Place, Hastings. Initially his business directory entry makes no mention of postcards: “landscape photographer, lanternist and photographic materials dealer”. Apart from lantern shows, these activities continued to be a major part of his business, prior to 1910.

The first Judges postcards were not produced until 1903. A newspaper advertisement of 15 August 1903 offers “P.O.P. postcards 12 costing 6d” (Printing Out Paper). This may refer to an arrangement with customers that the first postcards he produced were multiple copies of their photographs required for their own use. The earliest of the probably privately submitted cards known are three views for use by the nuns at the Convent Chapel at St Leonards-on-Sea. The earliest of these is postmarked 16 November 1903. Fred and/or his younger brother Thomas Winn Judge, who did much of the “back office” work, were quick to exploit the new medium available to visitors; namely postcards, with a view on the front, that they could write a message on the back and post to their friends and relatives.

Judges first published commercial card is probably a multi-view of the Great Storm of September 1903 of which a copy has been seen postmarked 4 October 1903. The only indication that these cards are by Judges is a tiny embossed Fred Judge on a corner of the card. By January 1904 other more general views of Hastings had been published in sepia bromide format. Other topics were produced including flowers and animals.

Between 1903 and 1908 Fred produced multiple local views and had his bicycle at the ready to take photographs of local events or disasters and produce postcards for sale, often by the next day. He was a keen member of his local photographic society and was able to promote himself nationally and internationally, receiving over 100 photographic medals and diplomas by 1908. In 1915 he joined the Royal Photographic Society and was elected a Fellow the same year.

== Early production ==
Between 1903 and 1908, a number of different types of photographic paper were used although 'Printing Out Paper' was widely used, with prints developing in the sunlight coming in through the shop and other windows. The problem was producing cards in quantity, and Judges also sent batches of negatives to other printers in England and Germany for series of coloured cards produced in collotype and photo-lithography. However, a turning point seems to have been in 1906 with the move to larger premises at 42 White Rock and the purchase of an exposing machine from Ellis Graber of Tunbridge Wells. This machine could produce larger production runs of cards to a consistent format and quality. This coincided with the publication of the first 10 cards in the new main series (that was eventually to run from 50-31782) which were used in the Judges Postcard Voting Competition. Initially black and white cards with a glossy surface were produced in this series before sepia tone became ubiquitous apparently because the tone was more sympathetic to being tinted.

== Formation of Judges Limited ==
In 1910 the firm again moved to new premises, bought more new Graber machinery and was re-formed as Judges Limited, a wholesale producer of postcards. The former retail shop was sold to Marriott. By appointing sole agents to sell their cards in specific towns and cities and opening their own retail depots in others, Judges became a national manufacturer. A card dated 1911 exists, written by T.H.W. Judge, and signed Judges Ltd, with which Thomas Winn sought business from W H Smith in Nottingham.

== Production between 1918 and 1939 ==
Towards the end of the First World War, the company experienced a shortage of paper and as a result had to buy some from Sanbride, or possibly sub contracted the printing to them. Judges was again at a turning point, but instead of closing Judges added £10,000 of preference shares to the existing £20,000 capital in 1920 to provide additional capital to build and equip a new machine shop, and open and stock additional wholesale and retail depots. Fred Judge took all the published negatives up to 7400 and probably up to 7699 but then in 1921 he took on Oliver Butler as an additional photographer who was carefully trained and monitored to ensure that his work was compatible and comparable with that of the master. Also by then Fred was using his artistic talents to produce packs of 4 or 6 lithographic sketch versions of certain cards and packs of 12 photogravure cards to offer cheaper alternatives.

By the 1920s, the success of the company was partially because they were able to establish a recognisable brand, known for the consistency and high quality of its products. Examples show that purchasers of their cards have specifically referred in the message on the card to the fact that they have purchased a Judges card or are sending it to a Judges card collector. In 1924 Fred Judge published a book Camera Pictures of London At Night. By June, 1926 the cost of a postcard was 2d. and hand tinted flower cards 4d. The new factory at St. Leonards was opened in 1927. Fred Judge ceased taking his own new negatives from No. 9347 apart from the Buttermere series from No. 9760 to 9841. Some cards taken by Fred Judge were given higher numbers than this as they were not published with other cards taken at the same time. Oliver Butler continued until No. 12971 was taken in 1930 the year when Norman Button was also employed. Between 1930 and 1932 they both continued until No. 15323 was published.

== Production 1939-1950 and the death of Fred Judge ==
The Second World War saw the cessation of new negatives and the company was in a poor state. Cards without a border were introduced during the war. The 1949 annual report mentions that a new Ford 10 car was not purchased until 1948 to enable Ernest to take new negatives. After the war home production of luxury items such as postcards was severely limited while exports were encouraged. A number of Irish cards are found without borders as after the war evidently efforts were made to sell cards to this “export market”. Fred Judge, on ARP duty, was injured by one of the last HE bombs to fall on Hastings and after a long illness died on 23 February 1950.

== 1950 onwards ==
Fred’s daughter Marjorie inherited the company, which was kept going through the quiet years of the 1950s mainly by the efforts of Ernest Bartholomew. The first 200 of the “C” series are older negatives with colour applied and printed on a rotaprint machine from about 1954. The first postmarked date of a “C” series card recorded is April, 1957. Again new investment in a German colour printing machine in 1960 and an offset litho machine in 1964 led to a rise in fortunes for the company. The main series of now sepia tone and black and white cards was continued with the colour series running alongside for a number of years. Evidence for this can be seen in the images of 30770 and C350, (30770 and C350 Pony Trekkers Elan Valley) which were clearly both taken on the same date about 1966.

Litone black-and-white printing was introduced for some customer preferences in 1957 and eventually black and white replaced the sepia until colour became the norm. Gradually a niche market was carved out with Judges continuing to trade on its past reputation producing high quality cards of the more select tourist locations and increasingly batches of cards to specific order for multiple organisations but primarily religious locations. Modern cards exist of small villages, country houses, retirement homes etc. Disaster did though almost strike in the early 1980s. The company was purchased by Peter Pugh of Burwood Ltd who were the selling agents for the Francis Frith Collection. However, the failure of an unrelated venture led to the company being placed in the hands of the receiver on 31 January 1984. Disaster though was averted and the company reformed as Judges Postcards Limited with the Wolford Family and former director Ernest C. Bartholomew taking control. Since then the company has developed from a niche producer, continuing producing cards to special order, but now producing larger quantities of cards of larger tourist locations for general sale and also developing cards of general interest such as the Thomas the Tank Engine Series. In 1995 postcards were only 30% of the company’s turnover and the percentage has decreased further since then.

Judges have continued to be produced for over 100 years, and have produced about 32,000 main series sepia tone and black and white cards, 800+ London cards, 800+ 4- main series multi-views, 500+ pre main series, 1000+ other non standard and serrated calendar cards, a series of 1,500+ “A” series black and white modern cards, as well as a continuing series of approaching 40,000 “C” series colour cards.

== Judges Postcard Study Group ==
A Judges Postcard Study Group, with about 40 members, exists. Andrew Reynolds is Chairman and Keeper of the Records. The group researches and collects Judges Postcards and also pools information to create an extensive database of the cards.
