= Court card (postcard) =

Type of postcard, mainly used in the United Kingdom

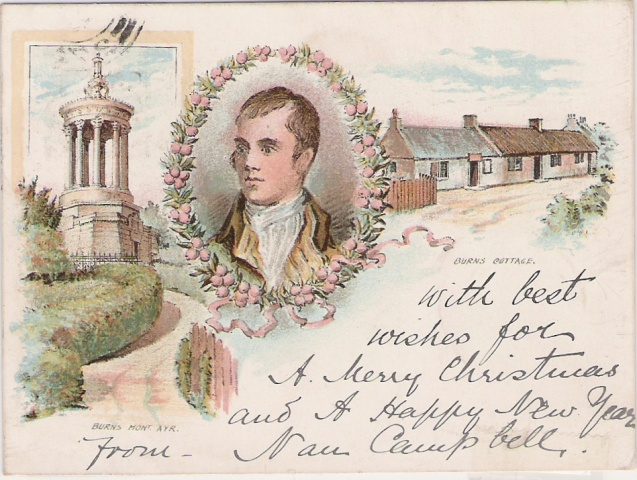
Example of a court card, postmarked 1899, showing Robert Burns and his cottage and monument in Ayr

Court card or court sized card was the name given to a size of picture postcard, mainly used in the United Kingdom, which were approximately 4.75 x 3.5 inches and predates the standard size of 5.5 x 3.5 inches.

Court cards were smaller and squarer in shape than later cards and were used from about 1894 to 1902. In keeping with the regulations of the time, they had an undivided back for the address only and the message had to be written on the 'front' of the card. Many fine examples of these still exist and are sought after by postcard collectors and philatelists alike. Although mainly used in the UK, many were printed by chromolithography in Germany.
