= Postcard =

Type of postal stationery

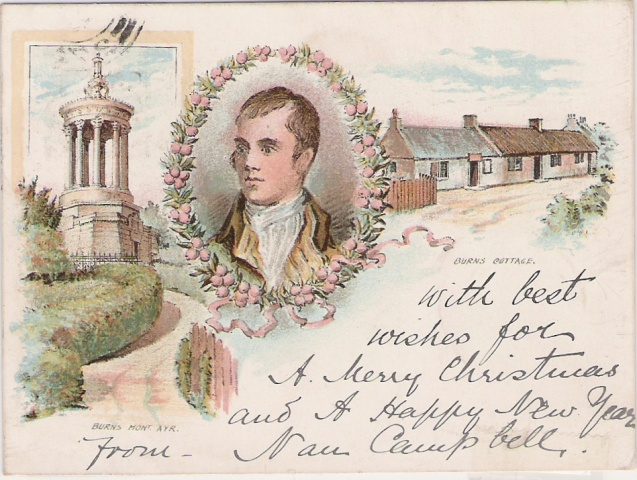
Example of a court card, postmarked 1899, showing Robert Burns and his cottage and monument in Ayr

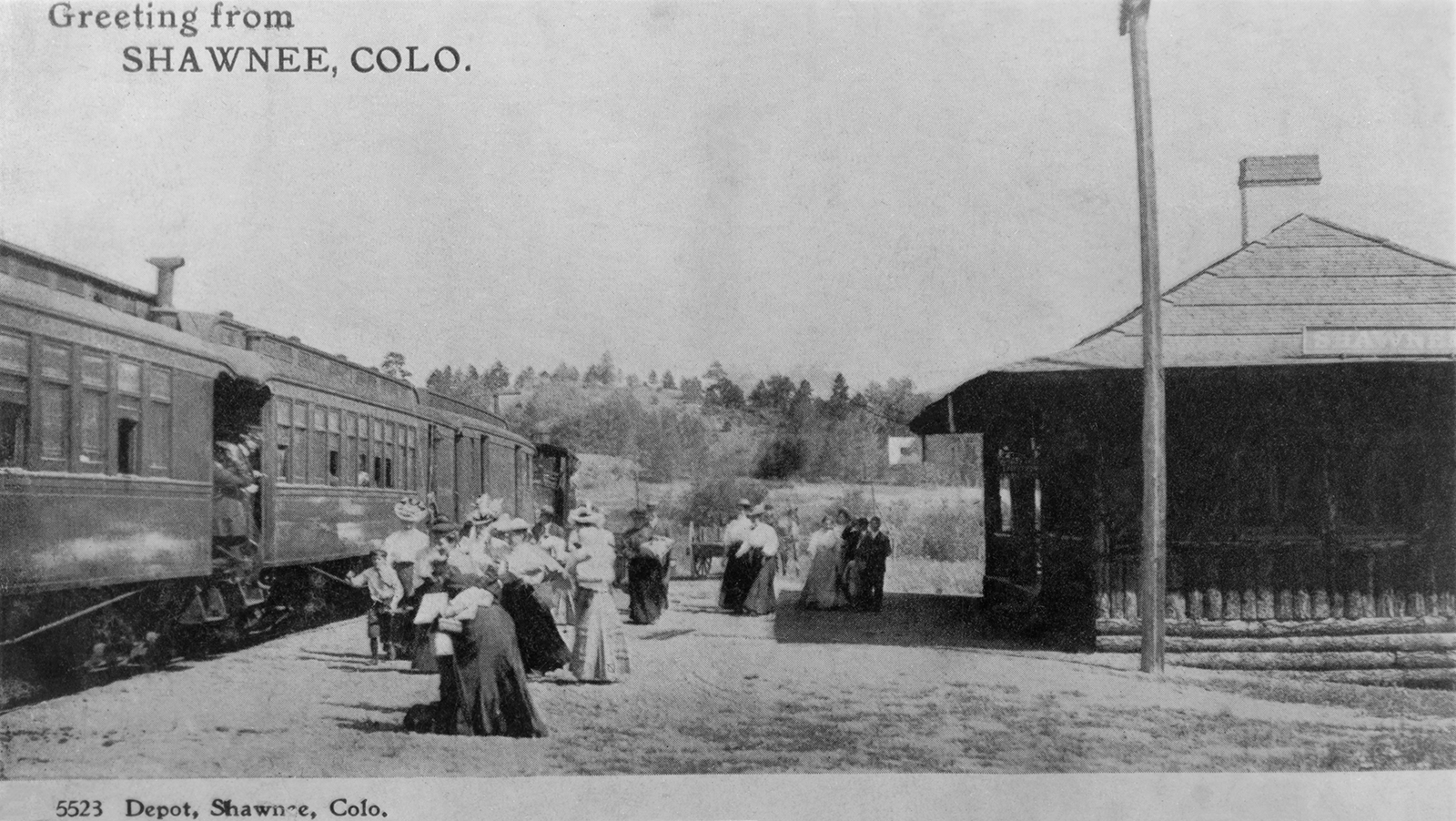
Postcard depicting people boarding a train at the Shawnee Depot in Colorado, late 19th century

A postcard or post card is a piece of thick paper or thin cardboard, typically rectangular, intended for writing and mailing without an envelope. Non-rectangular shapes may also be used but are rare.

In some places, one can send a postcard for a lower fee than a letter. Stamp collectors distinguish between postcards (which require a postage stamp) and postal cards (which have the postage pre-printed on them). While a postcard is usually printed and sold by a private company, individual or organization, a postal card is issued by the relevant postal authority (often with pre-printed postage).

Production of postcards blossomed in the late 19th and early 20th centuries. As an easy and quick way for individuals to communicate, they became extremely popular. The study and collecting of postcards is termed deltiology (from Greek deltion, small writing tablet, and the also Greek -logy, the study of).

== History ==
=== 1840 to 1864 ===
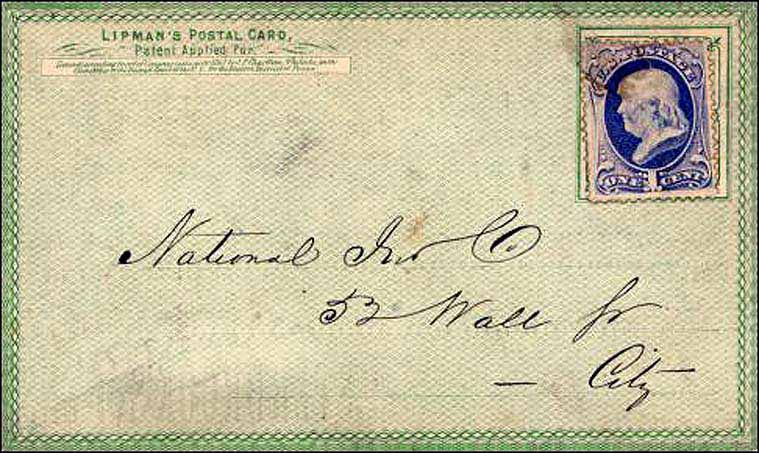
Lipman's Postal Card

Cards with messages have been sporadically created and posted by individuals since the beginning of postal services. The earliest known picture postcard was a hand-painted design on card created by the writer Theodore Hook. Hook posted the card, which bears a Penny Black stamp, to himself in 1840 from Fulham (part of London). He probably did so as a practical joke on the postal service, since the image is a caricature of workers in the post office. In 2002 the postcard sold for a record £31,750.

In the United States, the custom of sending through the mail, at letter rate, a picture or blank card stock that held a message, began with a card postmarked in December 1848 containing printed advertising. The first commercially produced card was created in 1861 by John P. Charlton of Philadelphia, who patented a private postal card, and sold the rights to Hymen Lipman, whose postcards, complete with a decorated border, were marketed as "Lipman's Postal Card". These cards had no images. While the United States government allowed privately printed cards as early as February 1861, they saw little use until 1870, when experiments were done on their commercial viability.

A recent discovery of a mention of postcards in an 1828 Austrian novella entitled Die Abendgenossen written by Friedrich Halm indicates that the postcard was possibly in use in Austria much earlier than had previously been supposed. As Dr. Tony Page writes in his Introduction to Die Abendgenossen (Blade Publications, Amazon Kindle, 2026, p. 17): 'Die Abendgenossen indicates that postcards (‘Postkarten’) were perhaps in use in Austria at a much earlier date [than previously thought]: one of the central characters in the story tells, towards the end of the tale, of how he is planning to go on his travels to various countries and has brought postcards along with him for the purpose (‘Postkarten mitgebracht’) – this in 1828!'

=== First postals and private postcards (c. 1865 to 1880) ===
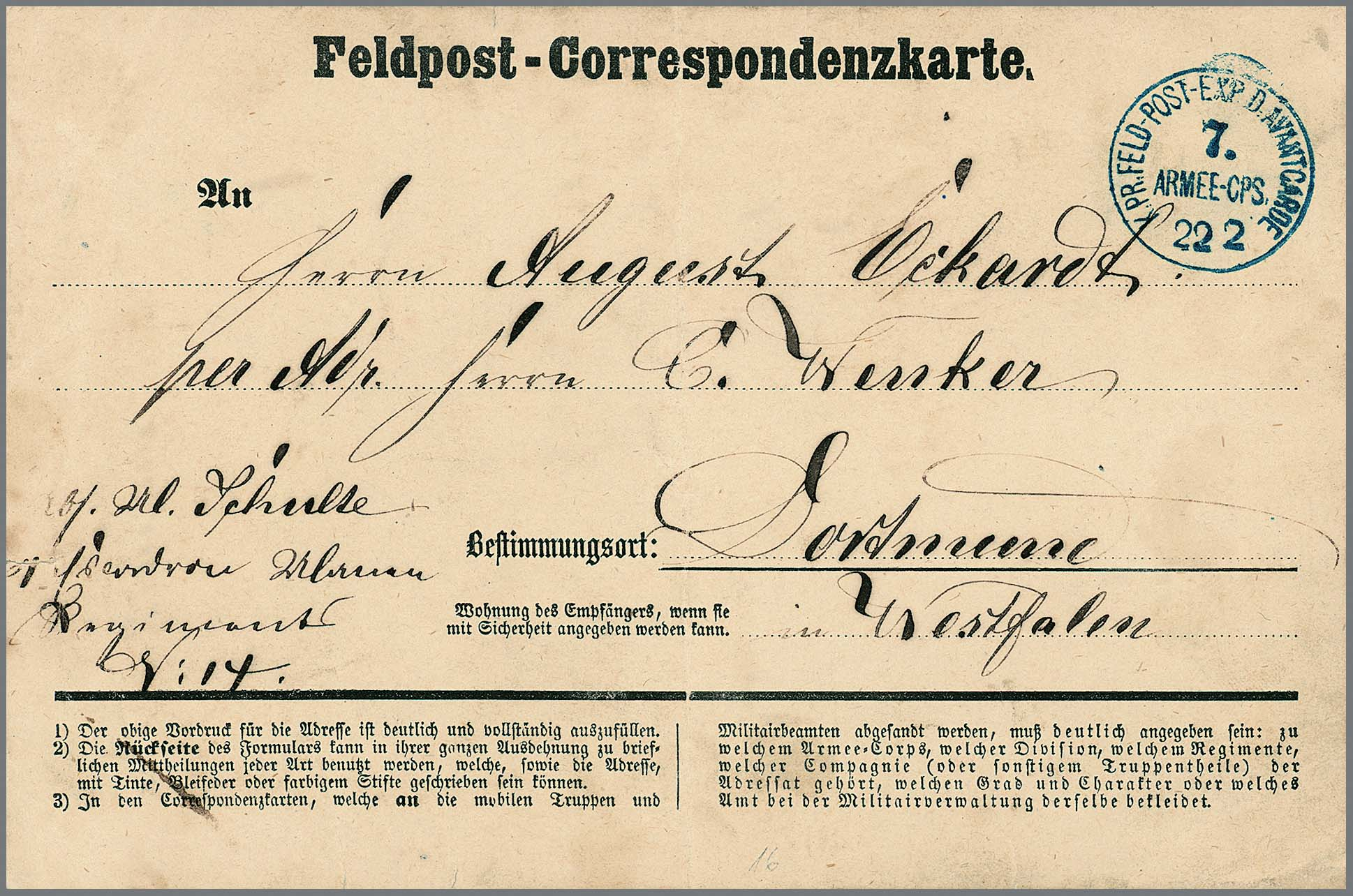
"Feldpost-Correspondenzkarte" (lit. 'field post correspondence card') used during the Franco-Prussian War of 1870

A Prussian postal official, Heinrich von Stephan, first proposed an "open post-sheet" made of stiff paper in 1865. He proposed that one side would be reserved for a recipient address, and the other for a brief message. His proposal was denied on grounds of being too radical and officials did not believe anyone would willingly give up their privacy. In October 1869, the post office of Austria-Hungary accepted a similar proposal, also without images, and 3 million cards were mailed within the first three months. With the outbreak of the Franco-Prussian War in July 1870, the government of the North German Confederation decided to take the advice of Austrian Emanuel Herrmann and issued postals for soldiers to inexpensively send home from the field.

The period from 1870 to 1874 saw a great number of countries begin the issuance of postals. In 1870, the North German Confederation was joined by Baden, Bavaria, Great Britain, Luxembourg and Switzerland. The year 1871 saw Belgium, Canada, Denmark, Finland, the Netherlands, Norway, and Sweden introduce their own postals. Algeria, Chile, France and Russia did so in 1872, and were followed by France, Japan, Romania, Serbia, Spain and the United States between 1873 and 1874. Many of these postals included small images on the same side as the postage. Postcards began to be sent internationally after the first Congress of the General Postal Union, which met in Bern, Switzerland in October 1874. The Treaty of Bern was ratified in the United States in 1875.

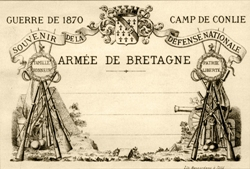
The claimed first printed picture postcard

The first known printed picture postcard, with an image on one side, was created in France in 1870 at Camp Conlie by Léon Besnardeau (1829–1914). Conlie was a training camp for soldiers in the Franco-Prussian War. The cards had a lithographed design printed on them containing emblematic images of piles of armaments on either side of a scroll topped by the arms of the Duchy of Brittany and the inscription "War of 1870. Camp Conlie. Souvenir of the National Defence. Army of Brittany" (in French). While these are certainly the first known picture postcards, there was no space for stamps and no evidence that they were ever posted without envelopes.

In Germany, the bookdealer August Schwartz from Oldenburg is regarded as the inventor of the illustrated postcard. On July 16, 1870, he mailed a post correspondence card with an image of a man with a cannon, signaling the looming Franco-Prussian war.

In the following year the first known picture postcard in which the image functioned as a souvenir was sent from Vienna. The first advertising card appeared in 1872 in Great Britain and the first German card appeared in 1874. Private advertising cards started appearing in the United States around 1873, and qualified for a special postage rate of one cent. Private cards inspired Lipman's card were also produced concurrently with the U.S. government postal in 1873. The backs of these private cards contained the words "Correspondence Card", "Mail Card" or "Souvenir Card" and required two-cent postage if they were written upon.

=== Golden age of postcards (c. 1890 to 1915) ===
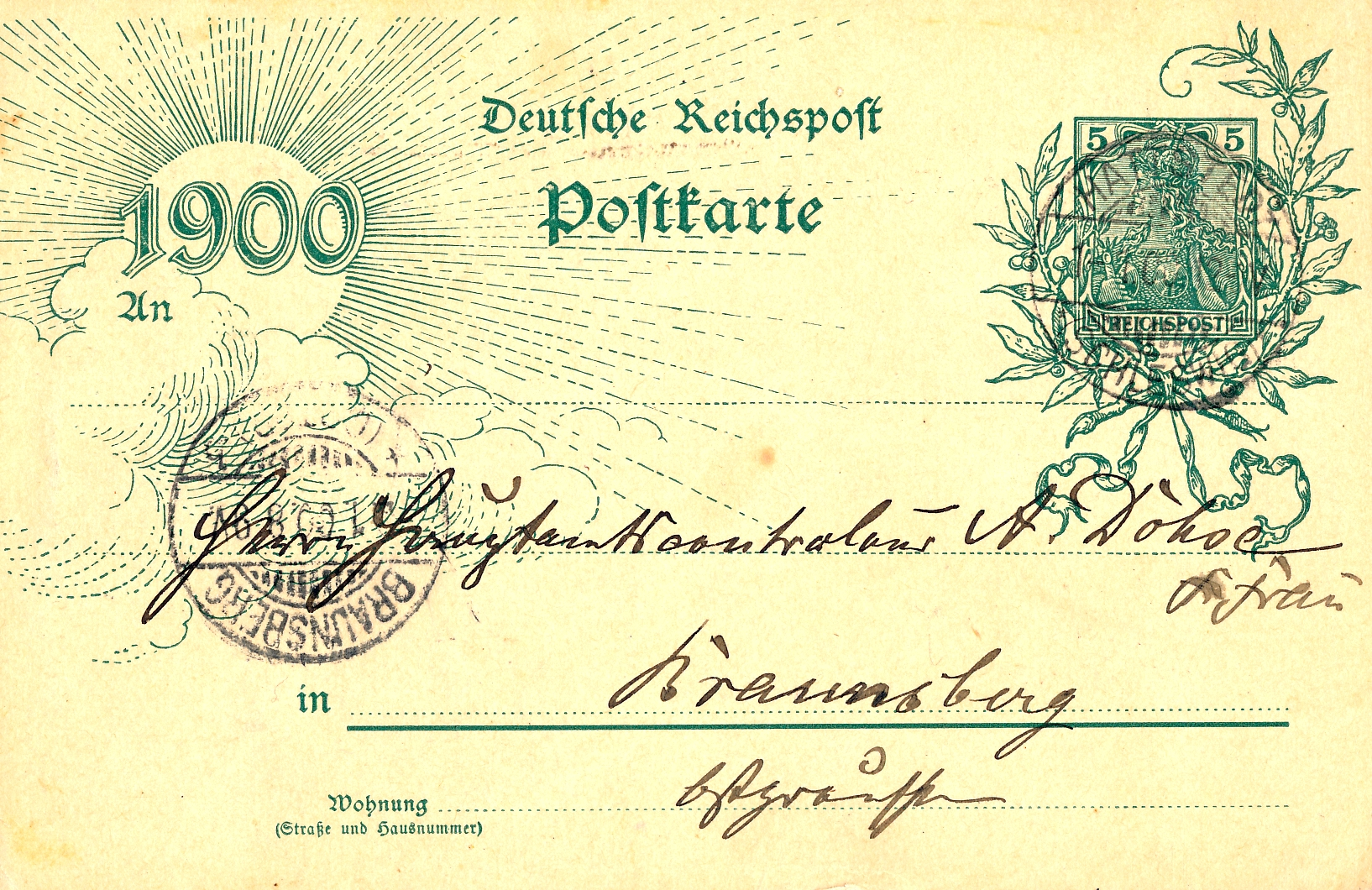
Postcard (postal stationary) from the German Reichspost at the turn of the century 1899/1900

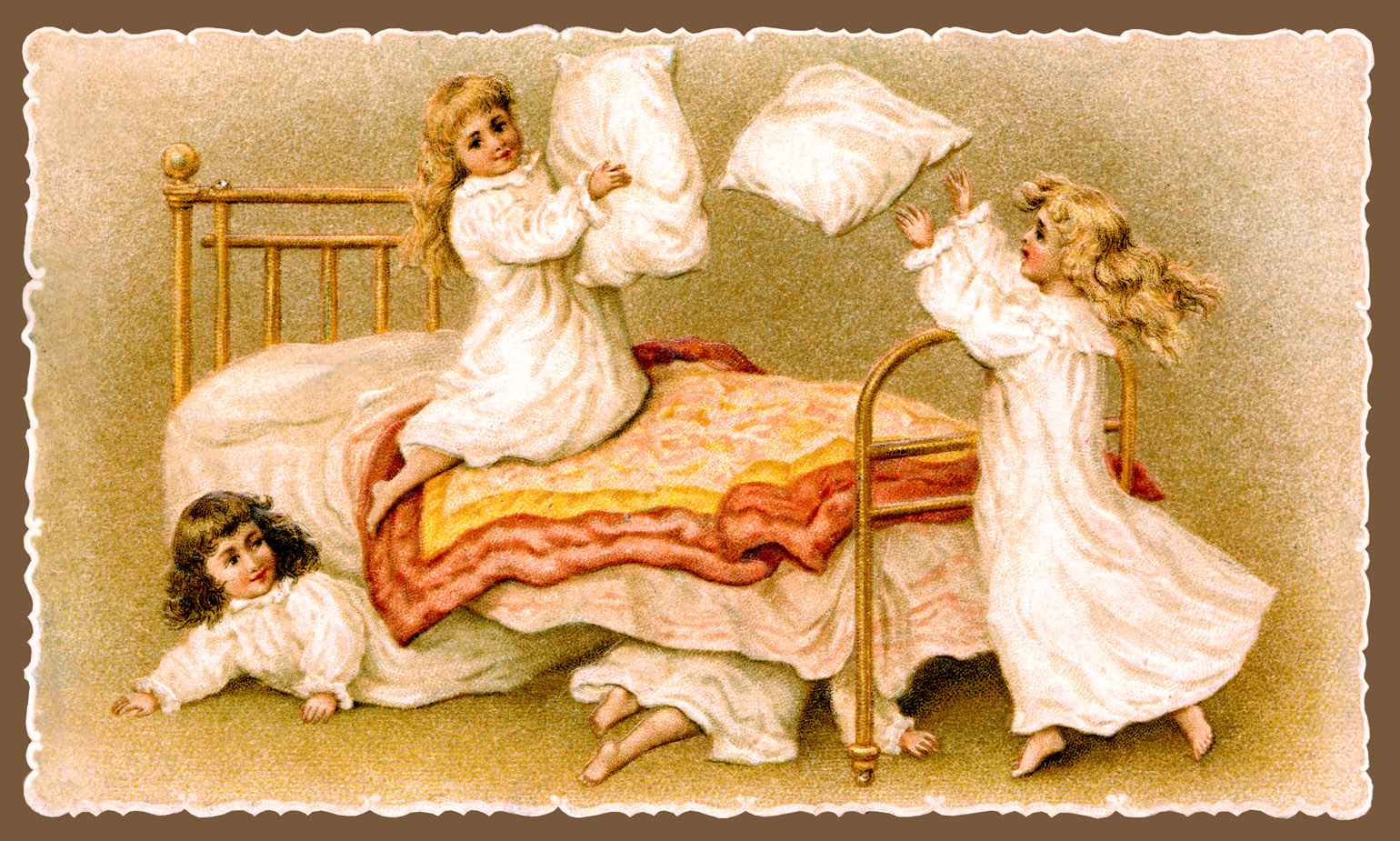
Austrian postcard from 1901

Cards showing images increased in number during the 1880s. Images of the newly built Eiffel Tower in 1889 and 1890 gave impetus to the postcard, leading to the so-called "golden age" of the picture postcard. This golden age began slightly earlier in Europe than the United States, likely due to a depression in the 1890s. Still, the Chicago World's Fair in 1893 excited many attendees with its line of "Official Souvenir" postals, which popularized the idea of picture postcards. The stage was now set for private postcard industry to boom, which it did once the United States government changed the postage rate for private cards from two cents to one in May 1898.

Spanning from approximately 1905 to 1915 in the United States, the golden age of postcards stemmed from a combination of social, economic, and governmental factors. Demand for postcards increased, government restrictions on production loosened, and technological advances (in photography, printing, and mass production) made the boom possible. In addition, the expansion of Rural Free Delivery allowed mail to be delivered to more American households than ever before. Billions of postcards were mailed during the golden age, including nearly a billion per year in United States from 1905 to 1915, and 7 billion worldwide in 1905. Many postcards from this era were in fact never posted but directly acquired by collectors themselves.

Despite years of incredible success, economic and government forces would ultimately spell the end of the golden age. The peak came sometime between 1907 and 1910 for the United States. In 1909, American publishers successfully lobbied to place tariffs on high quality German imports with the Payne-Aldrich Tariff Act. The effects of tariffs really started to make a large impact, and escalating hostilities in Europe made it difficult to import cards and ink into the United States. The fad may have also simply run its natural course. The war disrupted production efforts in Europe, although postcard production did not entirely stop. Cards were still useful for propaganda, and for boosting troop morale.

=== Post-World War I (1918 to present) ===
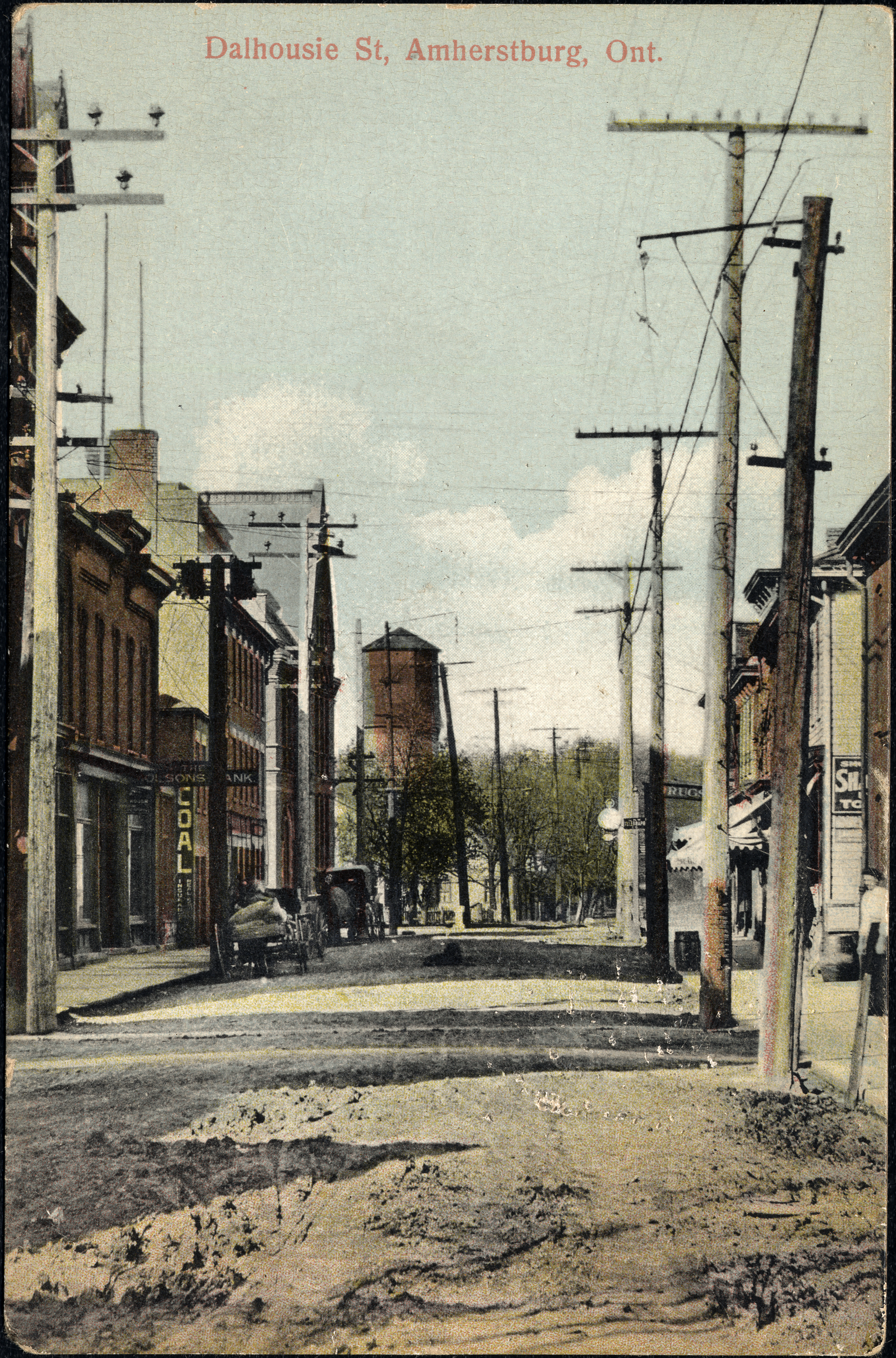
Postcard depicting Dalhousie Street, Amherstburg, Ontario, c. 1920, from the Alvin D. McCurdy fonds held at the Archives of Ontario

After the war, the production of postcards continued, albeit in different styles than before. Demand for postcards decreased, especially as telephone usage grew. There was still a need for postcards, which would be dubbed the "poor man's telephone". As tastes changed, publishers began focusing on scenic views, humor, and fashion. "White border" cards, which existed prior to the war, were produced in greater numbers from roughly 1915 to 1930 in the United States. They required less ink and had lower production standards than fine German cards. These were later replaced by "linen" postcards in the 1930s and 1940s, which used a printing process popularized by Curt Teich. Finally, the modern era of Photochrom (often shortened simply to "chrome") postcards began in 1939, and gained momentum around 1950. These glossy, colorful postcards are what we most commonly encounter today. Postcard sales dropped to around 25% of 1990s levels, with the growing popularity of social media around 2007, resulting in closure of long-established printers such as J Salmon Ltd in 2017.

== Country specifics ==
=== India ===
In July 1879, the Post Office of India introduced a quarter anna postcard that could be posted from one place to another within British India. This was the cheapest form of post provided to the Indian people to date and proved a huge success. The establishment of a large postal system spanning India resulted in unprecedented postal access: a message on a postcard could be sent from one part of the country to another part (often to a physical address without a nearby post office) without additional postage affixed. This was followed in April 1880 by postcards meant specifically for government use and by reply postcards in 1890. The postcard facility continues to this date in independent India.

=== Japan ===
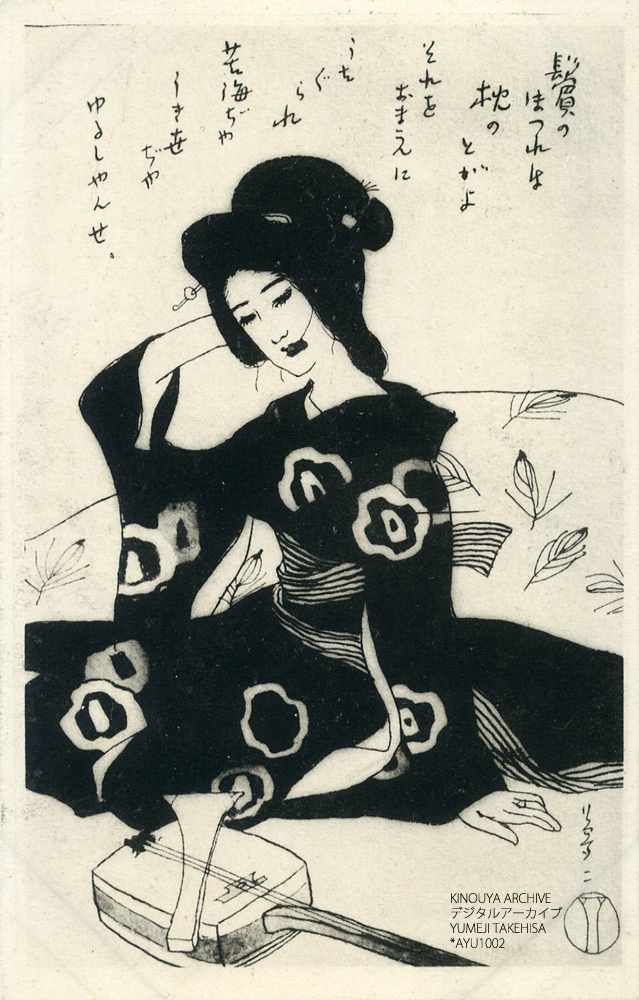
Postcard by Takehisa Yumeji, 1912

Official postcards were introduced in December 1873, shortly after stamps were introduced to Japan. Return postcards were introduced in 1885, sealed postcards in 1900, and private postcards were allowed from 1900.

Official Japanese postcards have one side dedicated exclusively to the address, and the other side for the content, though commemorative picture postcards and private picture postcards also exist. In Japan today, two particular idiosyncratic postcard customs exist: New Year's Day postcards (年賀状, nengajō) and return postcards (往復はがき, ōfuku-hagaki). New Year's Day postcards serve as greeting cards, similar to Western Christmas cards, while return postcards function similarly to a self-addressed stamped envelope, allowing one to receive a reply without burdening the addressee with postage fees. Return postcards consist of a single double-size sheet, and cost double the price of a usual postcard – one addresses and writes one half as a usual postcard, writes one's own address on the return card, leaving the other side blank for the reply, then folds and sends. Return postcards are most frequently encountered by non-Japanese in the context of making reservations at certain locations that only accept reservations by return postcard, notably at Saihō-ji (moss temple). For overseas purposes, an international reply coupon is used instead.

=== Russia ===
In the State Standard of the Russian Federation "GOST 51507-99. Postal cards. Technical requirements. Methods of Control" (2000) gives the following definition:

Post Card is a standard rectangular form of a paper for public postings. According to the same state standards, cards are classified according to the type and kind.

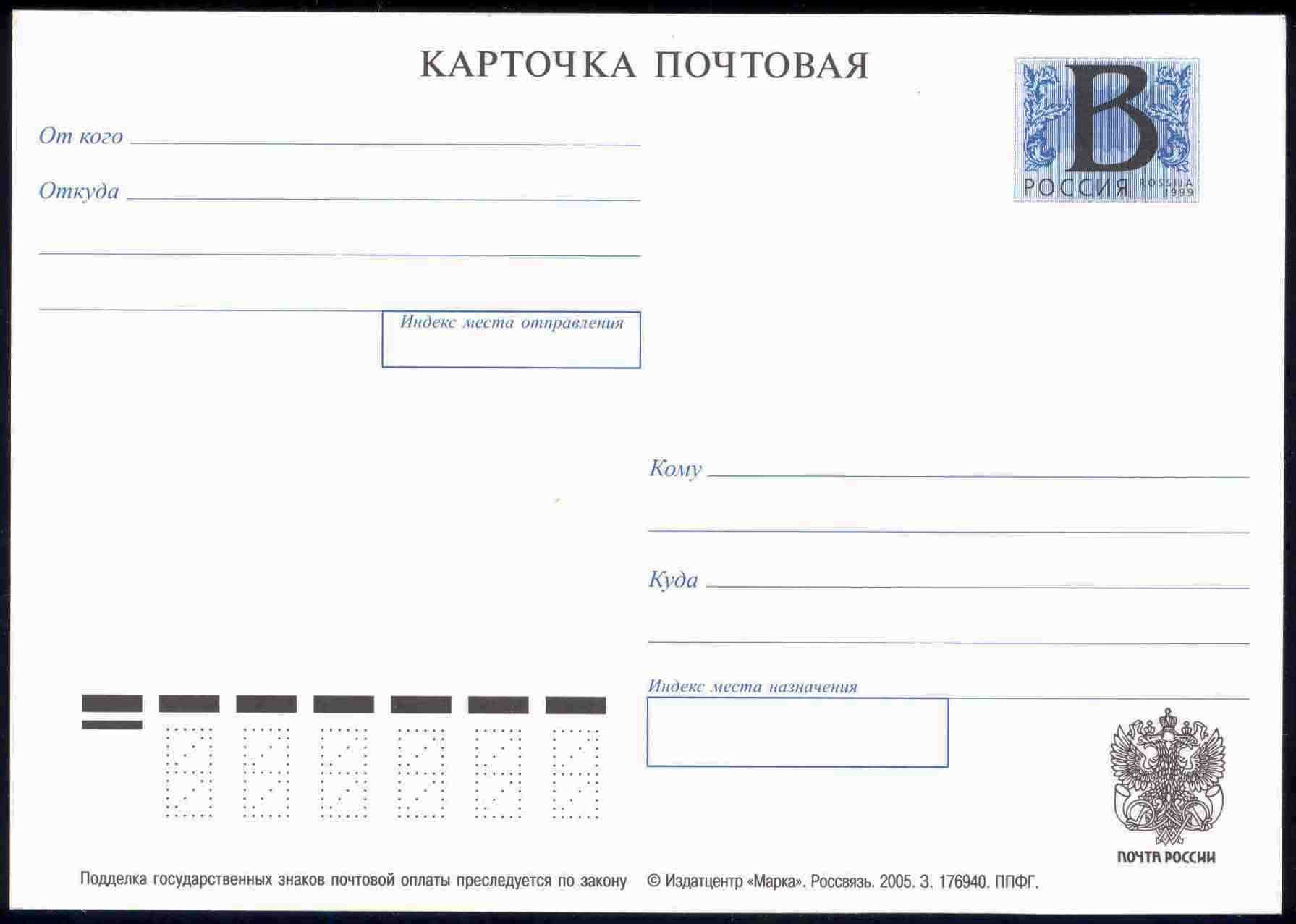
Standard stamped postcard Russia

Depending on whether or not the image on the card printing postage stamp cards are divided into two types:

- marked;
- unmarked.

Depending on whether or not the card illustrations, cards are divided into two types:

- illustrated;
- simple, that is non-illustrated.

Cards, depending on the location of illustrations divided into:

- Vector card at the location on the front side;
- on the reverse side.

Depending on the walking area cards subdivided into:

- cards for shipment within the Russian Federation (internal post);
- cards for shipment outside of the Russian Federation (international postage).

=== United Kingdom ===
==== History ====
In Britain, postcards without images were issued by the Post Office in 1870, and were printed with a stamp as part of the design, which was included in the price of purchase. These cards came in two sizes. The larger size was found to be slightly too large for ease of handling, and was soon withdrawn in favour of cards 13mm (1/2 inch) shorter. 75 million of these cards were sent within Britain during 1870.

In 1973 the British Post Office introduced a new type of card, PHQ Cards, popular with collectors, especially when they have the appropriate stamp affixed and a first day of issue postmark obtained.

==== Seaside postcards ====
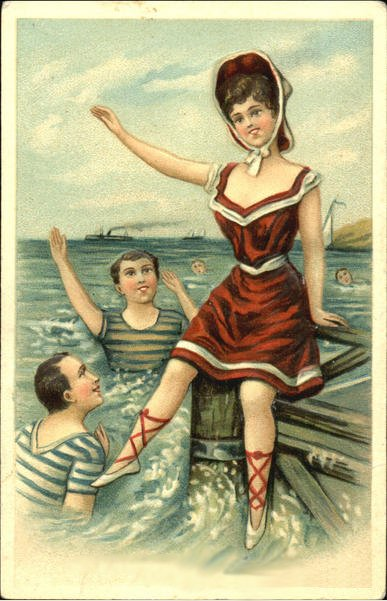
A seaside postcard

In 1894, British publishers were given permission by the Royal Mail to manufacture and distribute picture postcards, which could be sent through the post. It was originally thought that the first UK postcards were produced by printing firm Stewarts of Edinburgh but later research, published in Picture Postcard Monthly in 1991, has shown that the first UK picture card was published by ETW Dennis of Scarborough. Two postmarked examples of the September 1894 ETW Dennis card have survived but no cards of Stewarts dated 1894 have been found. Early postcards were pictures of landmarks, scenic views, photographs or drawings of celebrities and so on. With steam locomotives providing fast and affordable travel, the seaside became a popular tourist destination, and generated its own souvenir-industry.

In the early 1930s, cartoon-style saucy postcards became widespread, and at the peak of their popularity the sale of saucy postcards reached 16 million a year. They were often bawdy in nature, making use of innuendo and double entendres, and traditionally featured stereotypical characters such as vicars, large ladies, and put-upon husbands, in the same vein as the Carry On films.

A notable artist of seaside postcards, often saucy, was the illustrator Thomas Henry, most known for his portrayal of William Brown in the Just William book series by Richmal Crompton. He started drawing postcards as early as 1913, continuing well into the 1950s.

In the early 1950s, the newly elected Conservative government were concerned at the apparent deterioration of morals in the UK and decided on a crackdown on these postcards. The main target of their campaign was the postcard artist Donald McGill. In the more liberal 1960s, the saucy postcard was revived and later came to be considered, by some, as an art form.

Original postcards are now highly sought after, and rare examples can command high prices at auction. The best-known saucy seaside postcards were produced by the publishing company Bamforths of Holmfirth, West Yorkshire.

Despite the decline in popularity of postcards that are overtly "saucy", postcards continue to be a significant economic and cultural aspect of British seaside tourism. Sold by newsagents and street vendors, as well as by specialist souvenir shops, modern seaside postcards often feature multiple depictions of the resort in unusually favourable weather conditions. John Hinde used saturated colour and meticulously planned his photographs, which made his postcards of the later twentieth century become collected and admired as kitsch. Such cards are also respected as important documents of social history, and have been influential on the work of Martin Parr.

=== United States ===
The United States Postal Service defines a postcard as: rectangular, at least 3 1/2 inches (88.9 mm) high × 5 inches (127 mm) long × 0.007 inches (0.178 mm) thick and no more than 4 1/4 inches (108 mm) high × 6 inches (152.4 mm) long × 0.016 inches (0.406 mm) thick. However, some postcards have deviated from this (for example, shaped postcards).

== Controversies ==
=== Legalities and censorship ===
The initial appearance of picture postcards (and the enthusiasm with which the new medium was embraced) raised some legal issues. Picture postcards allowed and encouraged many individuals to send images across national borders, and the legal availability of a postcard image in one country did not guarantee that the card would be considered "proper" in the destination country, or in the intermediate countries that the card would have to pass through. Some countries might refuse to handle postcards containing sexual references (in seaside postcards) or images of full or partial nudity (for instance, in images of classical statuary or paintings). In one 2001 case, promotional postcards from Britain showing nude men photographed from behind were reportedly returned by U.S. postal authorities unless the exposed buttocks were obscured with black bars. Early postcards often showcased photography of nude women. Illegal to produce in the United States, these were commonly known as French postcards, due to the large number of them produced in France. Other countries objected to the inappropriate use of religious imagery. The Ottoman Empire banned the sale or importation of some materials relating to the Islamic prophet Muhammad in 1900. Affected postcards that were successfully sent through the Ottoman Empire before this date (and are postmarked accordingly) have a high rarity value and are considered valuable by collectors.

==== Lynchings ====
In 1873, the Comstock Act was passed in the United States, which banned the publication of "obscene matter as well as its circulation in the mails". In 1908, §3893 was added to the Comstock Act, stating that the ban included material "tending to incite arson, murder, or assassination". Although this act did not explicitly ban lynching photographs or postcards, it banned the explicit racist texts and poems inscribed on certain prints. According to some, these texts were deemed "more incriminating" and caused their removal from the mail instead of the photograph itself because the text made "too explicit what was always implicit in lynchings". Some towns imposed "self-censorship" on lynching photographs, but section 3893 was the first step towards a national censorship. Despite the amendment, the distribution of lynching photographs and postcards continued. Though they were not sold openly, the censorship was bypassed when people sent the material in envelopes or mail wrappers.

==== World War I ====
Censorship played an important role in the First World War. Each country involved utilized some form of censorship. This was a way to sustain an atmosphere of ignorance and give propaganda a chance to succeed. In response to the war, the United States Congress passed the Espionage Act of 1917 and Sedition Act of 1918. These gave broad powers to the government to censor the press through the use of fines, and later any criticism of the government, army, or sale of war bonds. The Espionage Act laid the groundwork for the establishment of a Central Censorship Board which oversaw censorship of communications including cable and mail.

Postal control was eventually introduced in all of the armies, to find the disclosure of military secrets and test the morale of soldiers. In Allied countries, civilians were also subjected to censorship. French censorship was modest and more targeted compared to the sweeping efforts made by the British and Americans. In Great Britain, all mail was sent to censorship offices in London or Liverpool. The United States sent mail to several centralized post offices as directed by the Central Censorship Board. American censors would only open mail related to Spain, Latin America or Asia—as their British allies were handling other countries. In one week alone, the San Antonio post office processed more than 75,000 letters, of which they controlled 77 percent (and held 20 percent for the following week).

Soldiers on the front developed strategies to circumvent censors. Some would go on "home leave" and take messages with them to post from a remote location. Those writing postcards in the field knew they were being censored, and deliberately held back controversial content and personal matters. Those writing home had a few options including free, government-issued field postcards, cheap, picture postcards, and embroidered cards meant as keepsakes. Unfortunately, censors often disapproved of picture postcards. In one case, French censors reviewed 23,000 letters and destroyed only 156 (although 149 of those were illustrated postcards). Censors in all warring countries also filtered out propaganda that disparaged the enemy or approved of atrocities. For example, German censors prevented postcards with hostile slogans such as "Jeder Stoß ein Franzos" ("Every hit a Frenchman") among others.

== Historical value ==
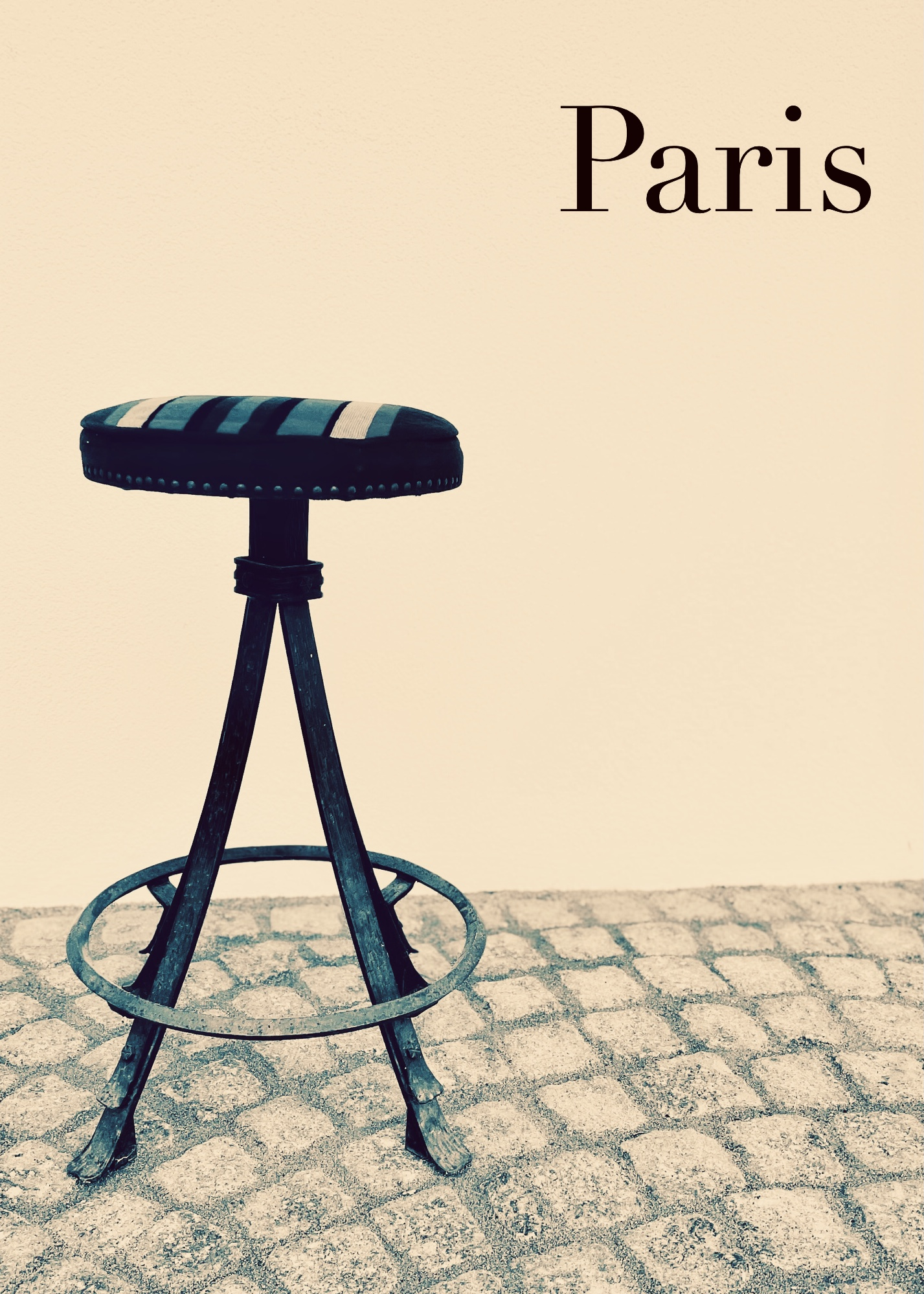
Postcard of Paris from 1971. Motive: 1960s Eiffel Tower Stool.

Postcards document the natural landscape as well as the built environment—buildings, gardens, parks, cemeteries, and tourist sites. They provide snapshots of societies at a time when few newspapers carried images. Postcards provided a way for the general public to keep in touch with their friends and family, and required little writing. Anytime there was a major event, a postcard photographer was there to document it (including celebrations, disasters, political movements, and even wars). Commemorating popular humor, entertainment, fashion, and many other aspects of daily life, they also shed light on transportation, sports, work, religion, and advertising. Postcards, such as those researched and printed by the Helene Victoria Press set up in 1973 by Nancy Poore and Jocelyn Cohen, have also been used to rescue unsung heroines, such as Irene Herlocker-Meyer from historical oblivion. Cards have also been sent to convey news of death and birth, store purchases, and employment.

As a primary source, postcards are incredibly important to the types of historical research conducted by historians, historic preservationists, and genealogists alike. They give insight into both the physical world, and the social world of the time. During their heyday postcards revolutionized communication, similar to social media of today. For those studying communication, they highlight the adoption of media, its adaptation, and its ultimate discarding. Postcards have been used to study topics as diverse as theatre, racial attitudes, women's history and war.

=== Digital collections ===
Libraries, archives, and museums have extensive collections of picture postcards; many of the postcards in these collections are digitized. Efforts are continuously being made by professionals in these fields to digitize these materials to make them more widely accessible to the public. For those interested, there are already several large collections viewable online. Some large digital collections of postcards include:

- OldNYC (New York Public Library)
- Digital Collections (New York Public Library)
  - These collections include the Detroit Publishing Company, holiday postcards, WWI postcards, and more.
- Curt Teich Postcard Archives Digital Collection (Newberry Library)
- Historische Bildpostkarten Universität Osnabrück (Osnabrueck University Library, Germany)
- The Pendergast Years (Kansas City Public Library)
- Northwest Historical Postcards Collection (University of Idaho)
- Kansas City, Kansas Postcard Collection (Kansas City, Kansas Public Library)
- Ernest G. Best postcard collection of merchant vessels, naval vessels and sailing vessels, 1900–1940. State Library of New South Wales, PXE 722/Items 1–4961.

== Collecting ==
It is likely that postcard collecting first began as soon as postcards were mailed. One could argue that actual collecting began with the acquisition of souvenir postcards from the world's fairs, which were produced specifically with the collector (souvenir hunter) in mind. Later, during the golden age of postcards, collecting became a mainstream craze. The frenzy of purchasing, mailing, and collecting postcards was often referred to as "postcarditis", with up to half purchased by collectors. Clubs such as The Jolly Jokers, The Society for the Promulgation of Post Cards, and the Post Card Union sprang up to facilitate postcard exchanges, each having thousands of members. Postcard albums were commonly seen in Victorian parlors, and had a place of prominence in many middle and upper class households.

Today, postcard collecting is still a popular and widespread hobby. The value of a postcard is mainly determined by the image illustrated on it. Other important factors for collectors can be countries, issuers, and authors. Online catalogs can be found on collector websites and clubs. These catalogs provide detailed information about each postcard alongside their picture. In addition, these websites include collection management tools, trading platforms, and forums to assist with discussions between collectors. The oldest continuously run club in the United States is the Metropolitan Postcard Club of New York City, founded in 1946.

== Glossary of terminology ==
Most of the terms on this list were devised by modern collectors to describe cards in their possession. For the most part, these terms were not used contemporaneously by publishers or others in the industry.

3D Postcard
Postcards with artwork that appears in 3D. This can be done with different techniques, such as lenticular printing or hologram.

Advertising Postcard
Specialist marketing companies in many countries produce and distribute advertising postcards which are available for free. These are normally offered on wire rack displays in plazas, coffee shops and other commercial locations, usually not intended to be mailed.

Appliqué
A postcard that has some form of cloth, metal or other embellishment attached to it.

Art Déco
Artistic style of the 1920s, recognizable by its symmetrical designs and straight lines.

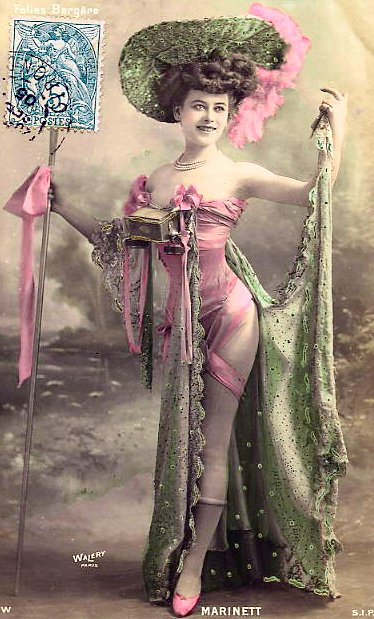
Folies Bergère costume, c. 1900

Art Nouveau
Artistic style of the turn of the century, characterized by flowing lines and flowery symbols, yet often depicting impressionist more than representational art.

Artist Signed
Postcards with artwork that has the artist's signature, and the art is often unique for postcards.

Bas Relief
Postcards with a heavily raised surface, giving a papier-mâché appearance.

Big Letter
A postcard that shows the name of a place in very big letters that do not have pictures inside each letter (see also Large Letter).

Composites
A number of individual cards, that when placed together in a group, form a larger picture. Also called "installment" cards.

Court Card
The official size for British postcards between 1894 and 1899, measuring 115 mm × 89 mm (4.5 in × 3.5 in).

Divided Back
Postcards with a back divided into two sections, one for the message, the other for the address. British cards were first divided in 1902 and American cards in 1907.

Early
Any card issued before the divided back was introduced (pre-1907).

Embossed
Postcards with a raised surface.

Exaggeration
Postcards featuring impossibly large animals and crops, created using trick photography and other methods.

Folded
Postcards that are folded, so that they have at least 4 pages. Most folded cards need to be mailed inside an envelope, but there are some that can be mailed directly.

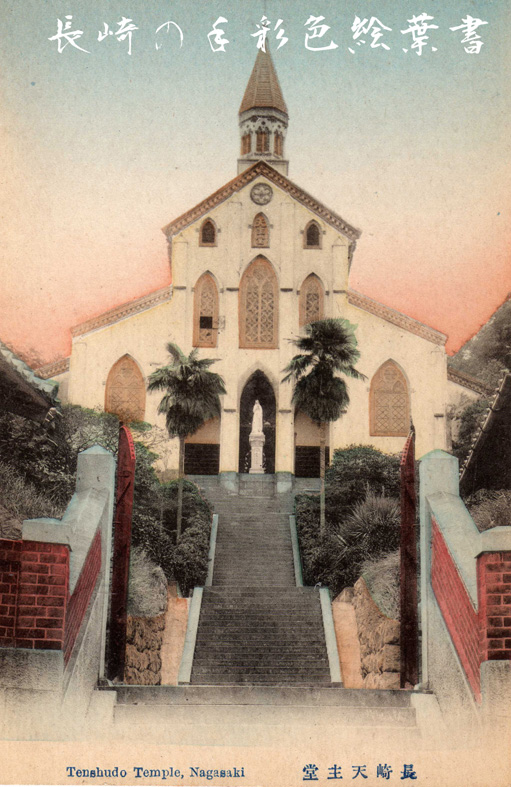
Ōura Church, hand-tinted postcard

Hand-tinted
Black-and-white images were tinted by hand using watercolors and stencils.

Hold-to-Light
Also referred to as 'HTL', postcards often of a night time scene with cut out areas to show the light.

Intermediate Size
The link between Court Cards and Standard Size, measuring 130 mm × 80 mm (5.1 in × 3.1 in).

Kaleidoscope
Postcards with a rotating wheel that reveals a myriad of colours and patterns when turned.

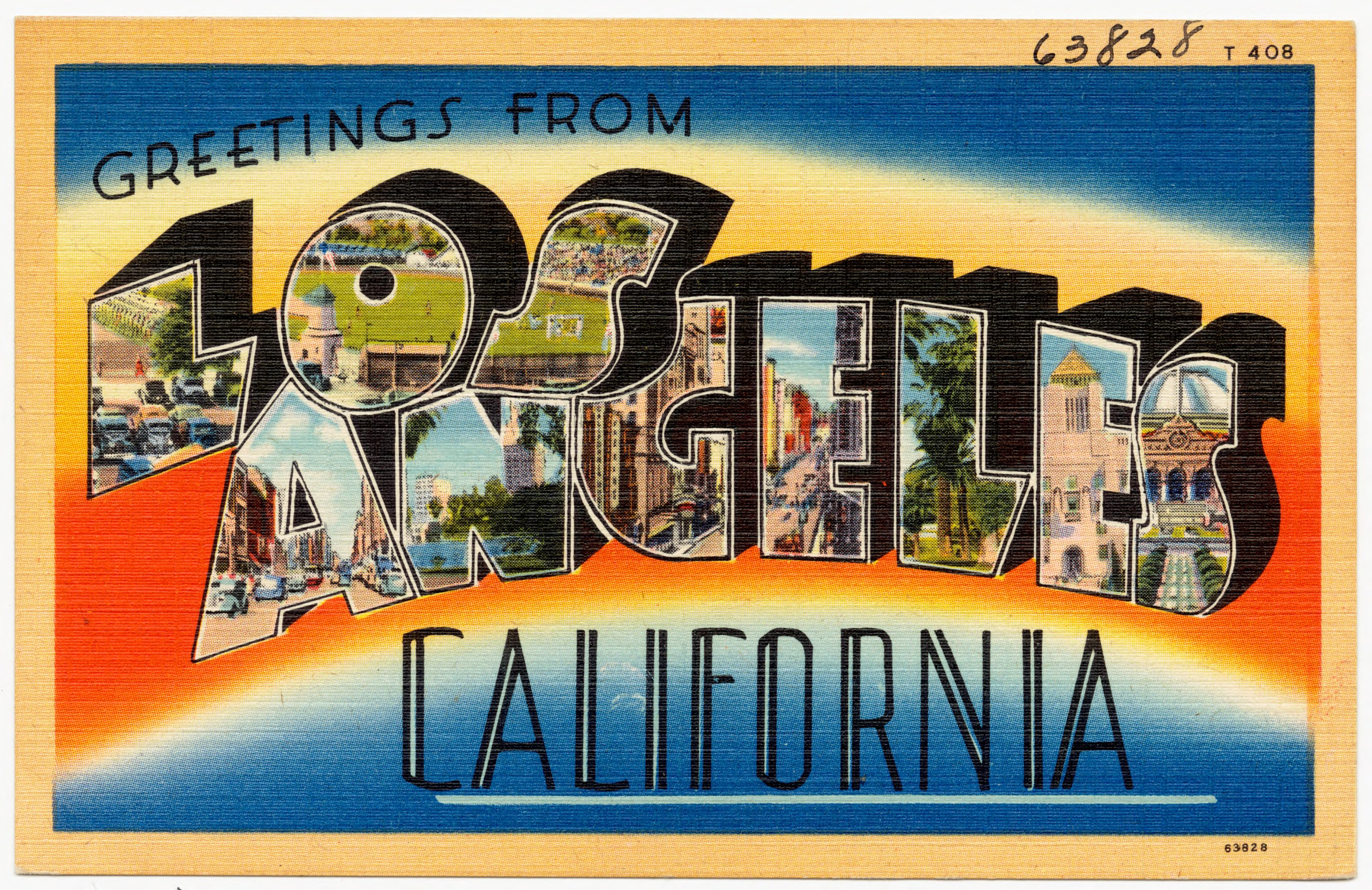
"Large Letter" card c. 1940s

Large Letter
A postcard that has the name of a place shown as a series of very large letters, inside of each of which is a picture of that locale (see also Big Letter).

Maximum Card
Postcards with a postage stamp placed on the picture side of the card and tied by the cancellation, usually the first day of issue.

Midget Postcard
Novelty cards of the size 90 mm × 70 mm (3.54 in × 2.76 in).

Novelty
Any postcard that deviates from the norm. These include cards which do something (such as mechanical postcards) or which have articles attached to them. They could also be printed in an unusual size or shape, or made of strange materials (including leather, wood, metal, silk, or coconut).

Oilette
A trade name used by London publisher Raphael Tuck & Sons for postcards reproduced from original painting.

Postcard Folder
A set of picture postcards, printed on light-weight paper, which fold out accordion-style from an outer envelope (folder). These typically contain more than 5 cards.

Postcardese
The style of writing used on postcards; short sentences, jumping from one subject to another.

QSL Card
Postcards that confirms a successful reception of a radio signal on amateur radio.

Real Photographic
"Real photo postcards", as collectors have dubbed them, are often abbreviated as "RP" or "RPPC". Most of these were produced in small batches from an original negative by an individual or a local store. They are not printed.

Reward Card
Cards that were given away to school children for good work.

Special Property Card
Postcards that are made of a material other than cardboard or contains something made not of cardboard.

Standard Size
Introduced in Britain in November 1899, measuring 140 mm × 89 mm (5.5 in × 3.5 in).

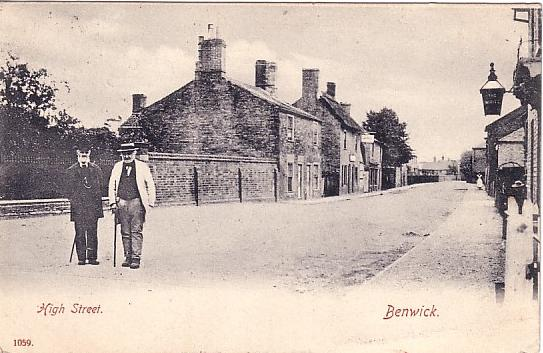
A topographical postcard of Benwick, UK, featuring a vignette, therefore likely an undivided back (pre-1907)

Topographical
Postcards showing street scenes and general views. Judges Postcards produced many British topographical views.

Undivided Back
Postcards with a plain back where all of this space was used for the address. This is usually in reference to early cards, although undivided were still in common use up until 1907. In 1907, the Universal Postal Congress published a series of decrees that permitted postcards to bear messages on the left half of the card's back. This allowed printers to eschew the vignette in favor of extending the picture to the edges, ensuing the divided-back "Golden Age of Postcards."

Vignette
Usually found on "undivided back" cards, consisting of a design that does not occupy the whole of the picture side. Vignettes may be anything from a small sketch in one corner of the card, to a design cover three quarters of the card. The purpose is to leave some space for the message to be written, as the entire reverse of the card could only be used for the address.

Write-Away
A card with the opening line of a sentence, which the sender would then complete. Often found on early comic cards.

== Gallery ==
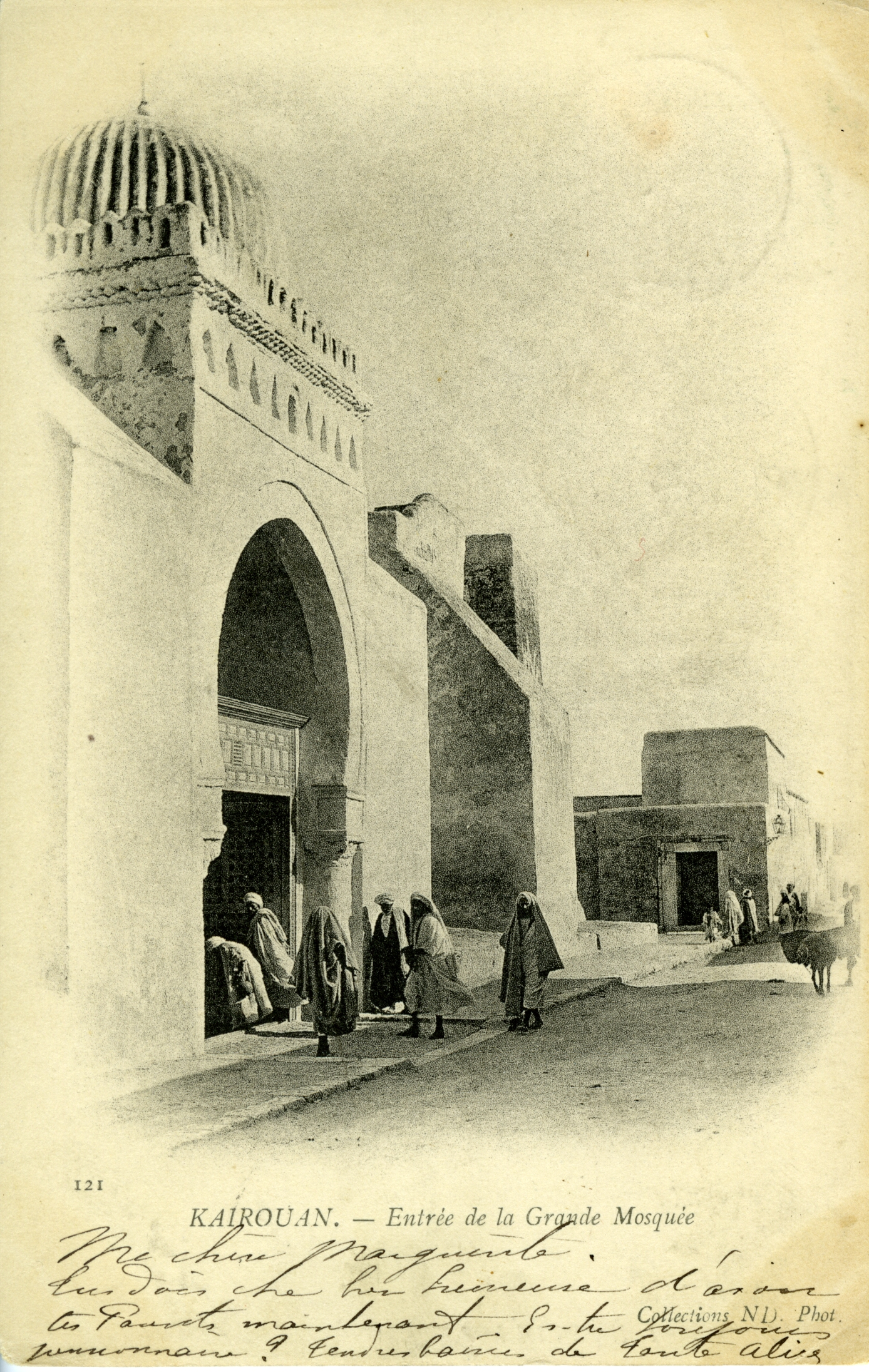
Entry of the Great Mosque of Kairouan, postcard from 1900

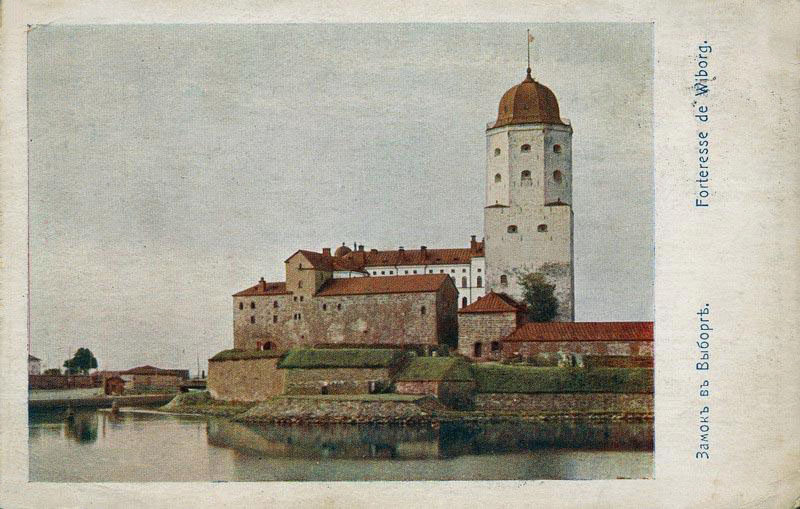
Fortress in Vyborg, postcard from 1917

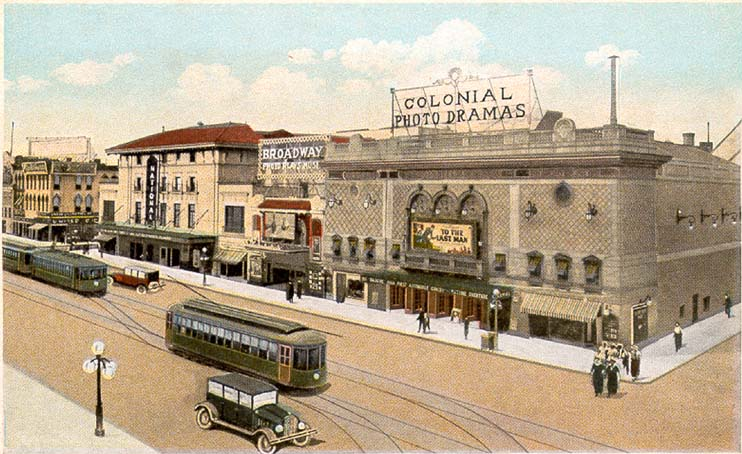
Richmond, Virginia, c. late 1923. The intersection shown is at 8th & Broad streets.

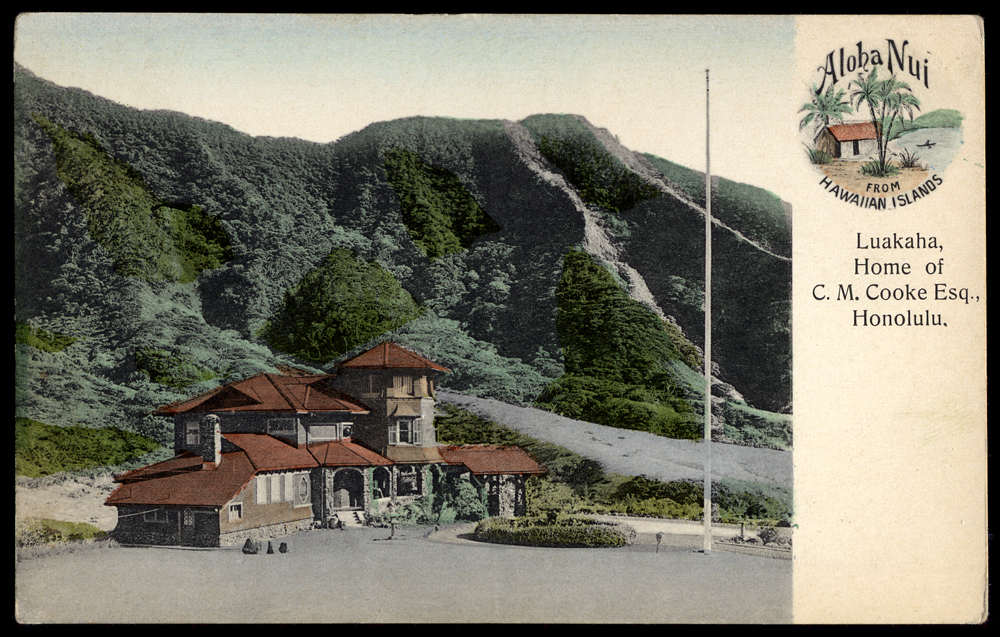
Hawaiian Aloha nui Postcard c. 1908

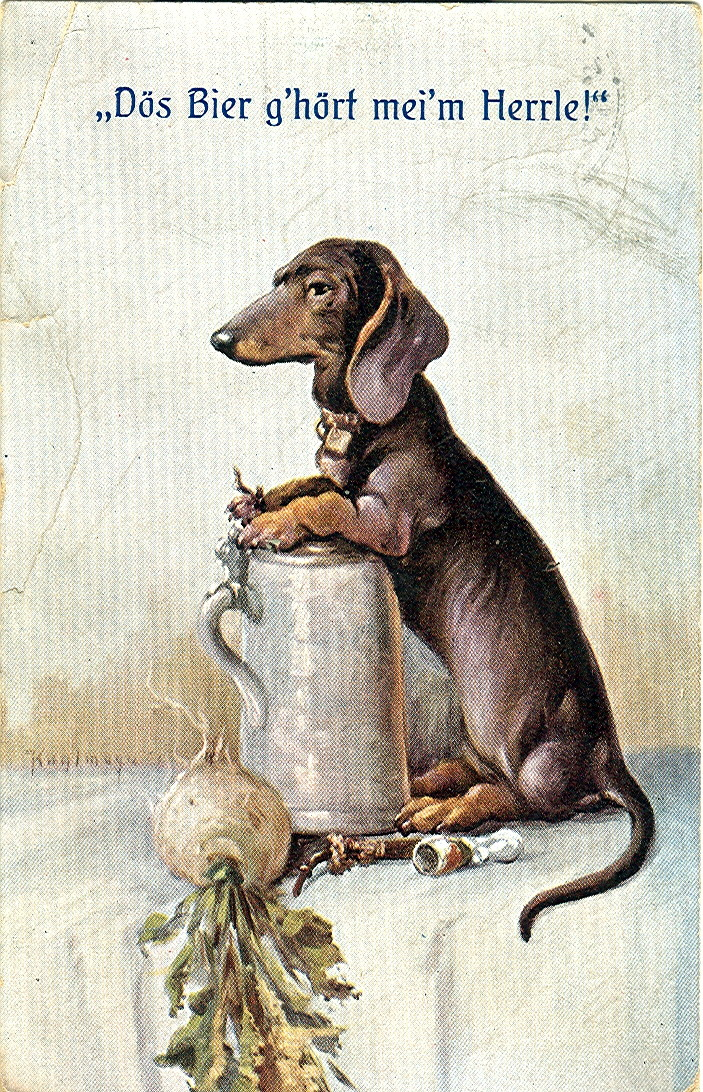
German postcard with inscription "This beer belongs to my master!"

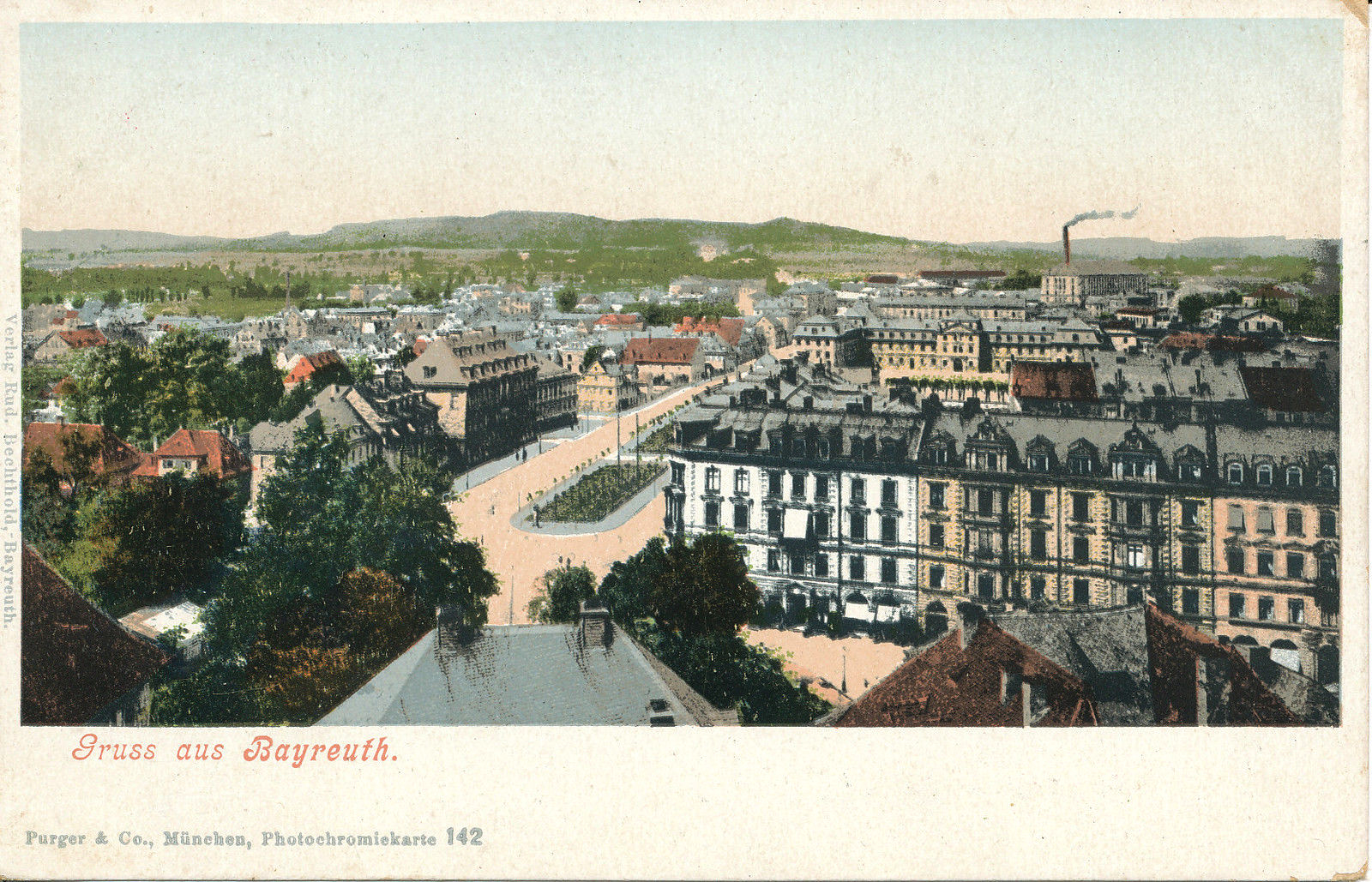
Gruss aus–type postcard, published by the Munich-based German printing house Purger & Co.

== See also ==
- Advertising postcard
- Frances Brundage
- Ellen Clapsaddle
- Comité des Étudiants Américains de l'École des Beaux-Arts Paris
- Deltiology
- e-card
- Francis Frith
- Greeting card
- Esther Howland
- Illustrated stamped envelope
- Judges Postcards
- Mail Art
- Paper sizes
- PHQ Cards
- Postal card
- Postcardware
- Postcrossing
- PostSecret
- QSL card
- Real photo postcard
- F. G. O. Stuart
- James Valentine
