= Advertising postcard =

Postcard used for marketing purposes

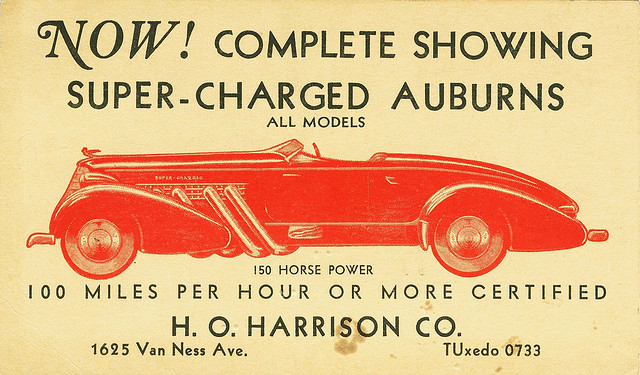
1935 penny postcard advertising Auburn Automobiles

An advertising postcard is a postcard used for advertising purposes (as opposed to a tourism or greeting postcard). Postcards are used in advertising as an alternative to or to complement other print advertising such as catalogs, letters, and flyers. Advertising postcards may be mailed or distributed in other ways.

== Definition ==
An advertising postcard is a privately, commercially produced, rectangular piece of stiff paper (typically 3.5 X 5.5 inches, or 148mm x 105mm in Europe) printed in a form that is easy to send through the post and is designed to carry promotional messages of products or services.

== Brief history ==
From the 18th century, trade cards were used by businesses to promote a wide variety of goods and services. Commercial 18th century publishing houses not only printed cards, but also assisted local business with their distribution. These trade cards were the precursor to the modern advertising postcard. By the late 19th century many well-known companies used trade cards as a form of promotion including: Colgate & Palmolive, Van Houten's cocoa, Clark's spool cotton, Tarrant's seltzer as well as many cigarette companies, sporting clubs and celebrities. These advertising postcards were also used for propaganda.

These popularity of trade cards continued until well after the first world war, but began to wane with the introduction of commercial radio broadcasting in the 1920s due to advertisers' preferences for the immediacy of radio as a means of reaching mass audiences in a cost efficient manner. However, in the 1990s, advertising postcards regained some of their former popularity. Advertisers began to resurrect them as part of an overall integrated media strategy designed to reach highly mobile and 'hard-to-reach' youth markets.

Trade cards and advertising postcards through the ages

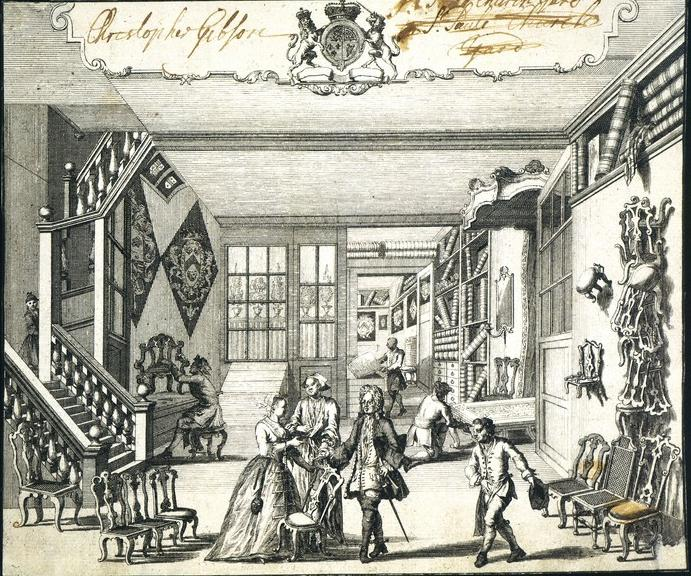
A trade card for a furniture retailer and upholsterer, 1730-1742, V & A Museum

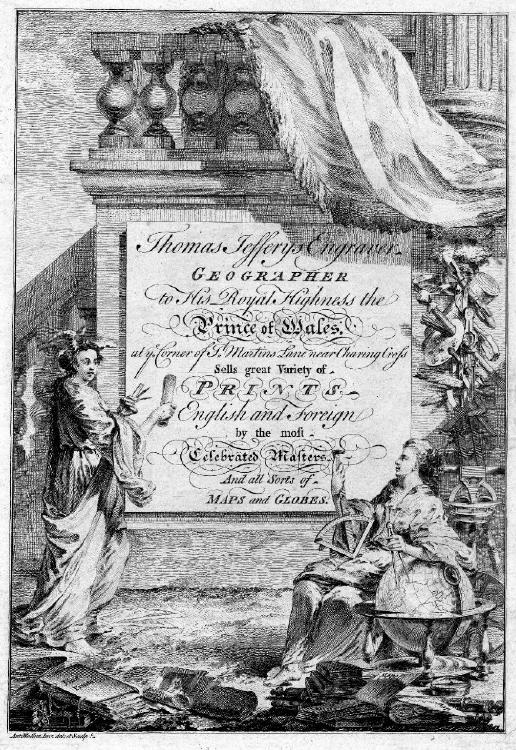
Trade card of Thomas Jeffreys, 1750

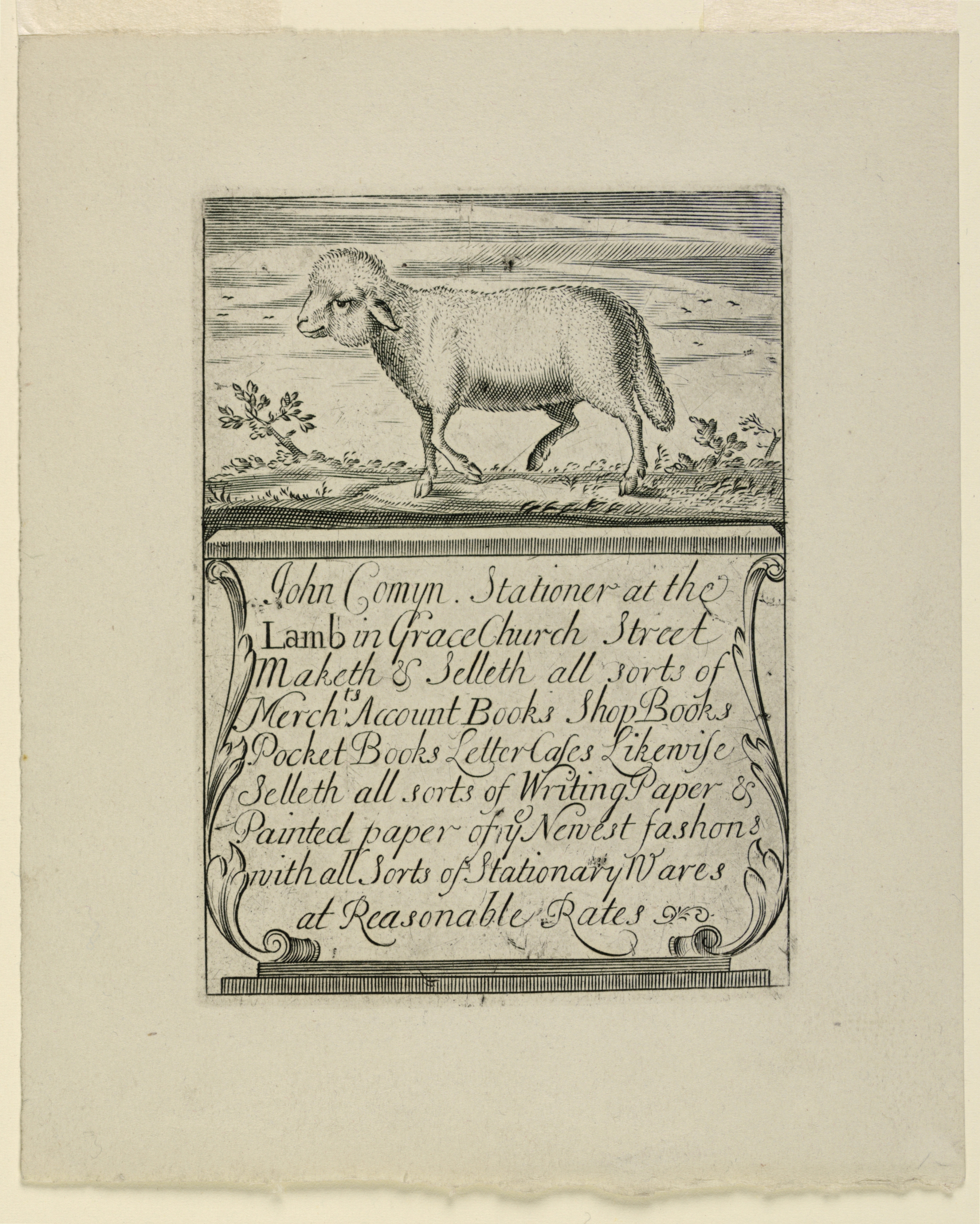
Trade Cards operated as advertising in the 18th century, Retail trade card, c. 1750

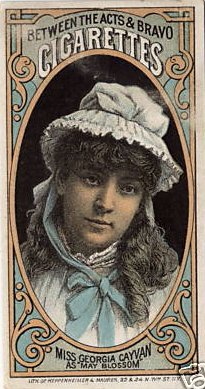
Cigarette card featuring the popular actress, Georgia Cayvan, c 1882

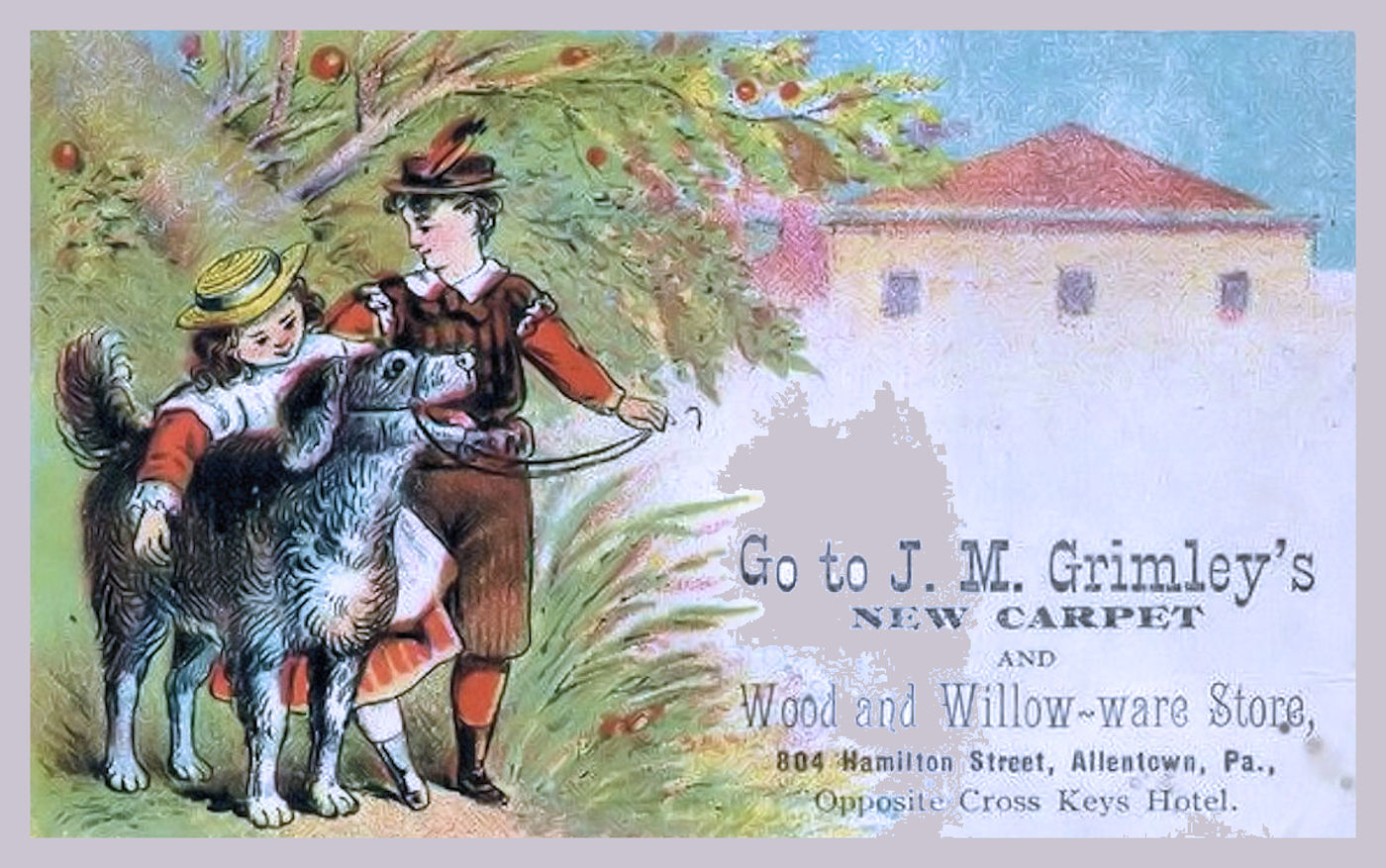
Retail trade card for Jeremiah M Grimley, c. 1884

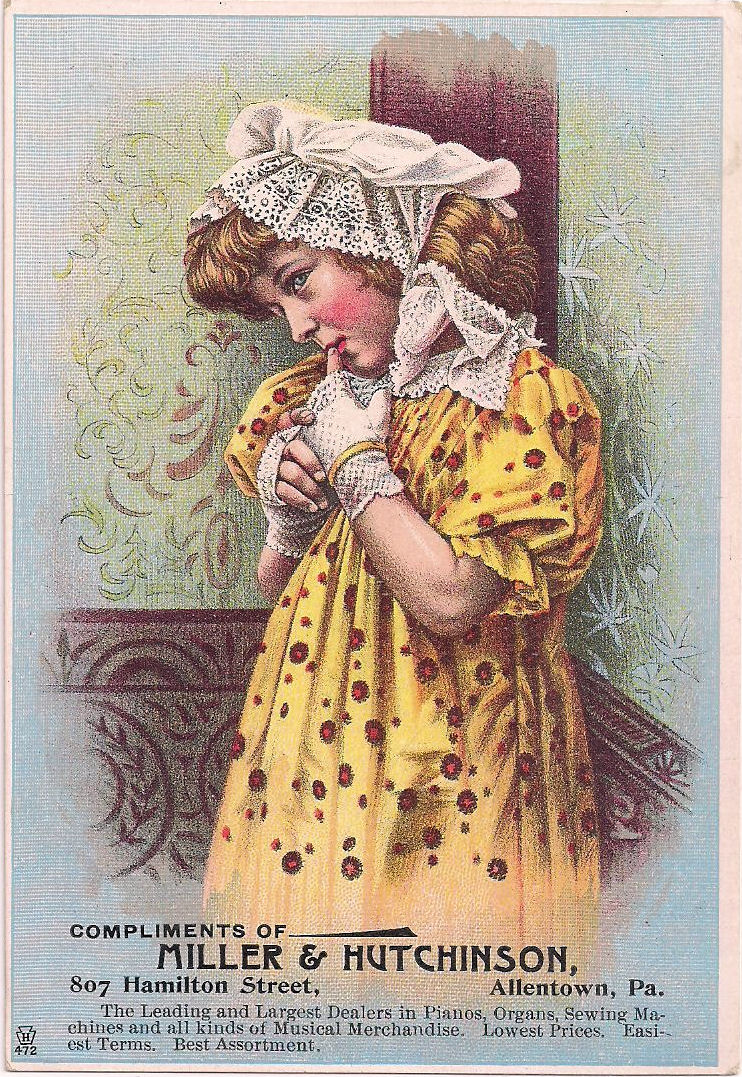
Trade card for Miller & Hutchinson, piano, organ and musical instrument dealers, 1891

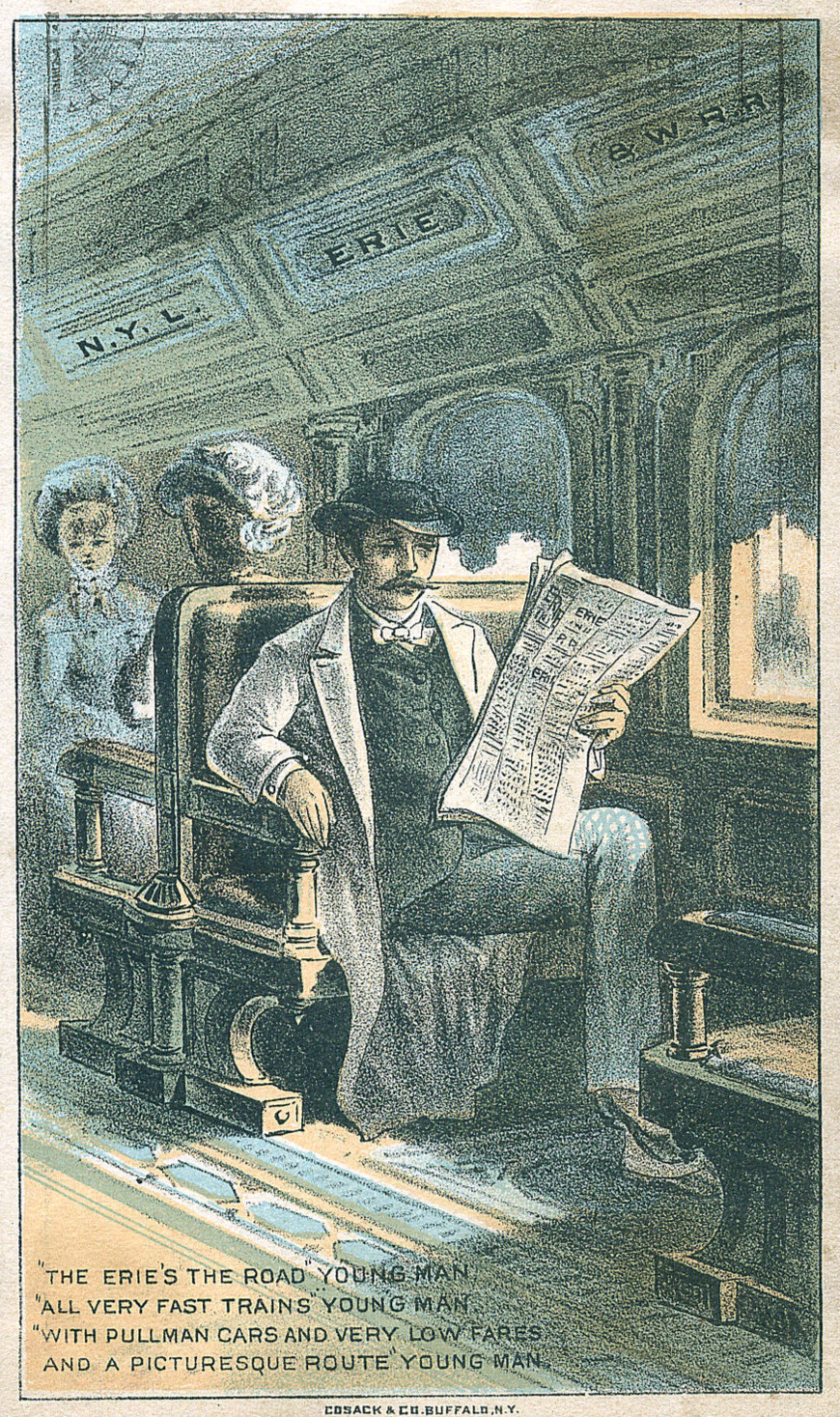
Erie Railroad trade card, before 1900

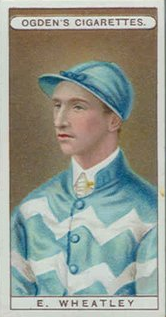
Ogden's cigarette card featuring jockey, Elijah Wheatley, c.1905

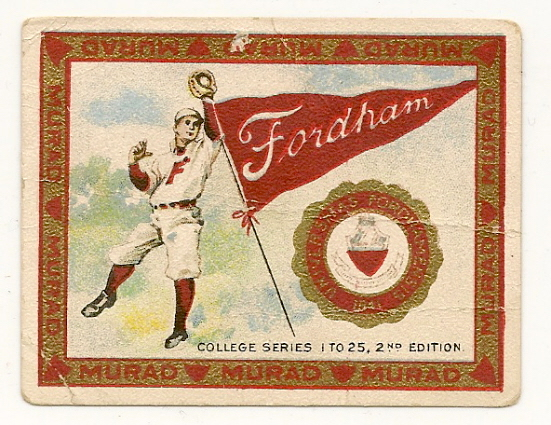
Fordham baseball card c. 1910

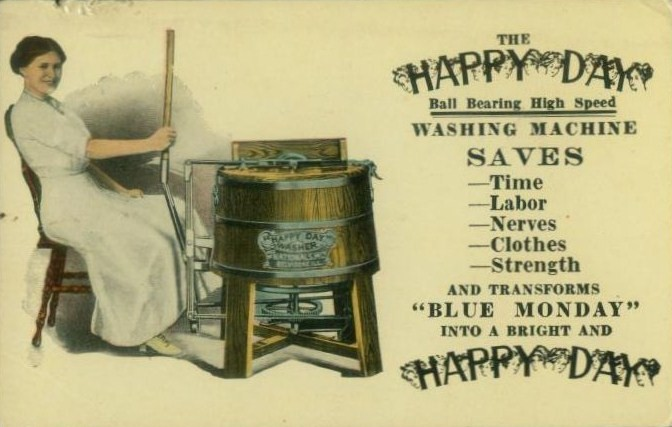
The Happy Day washing machine, 1910

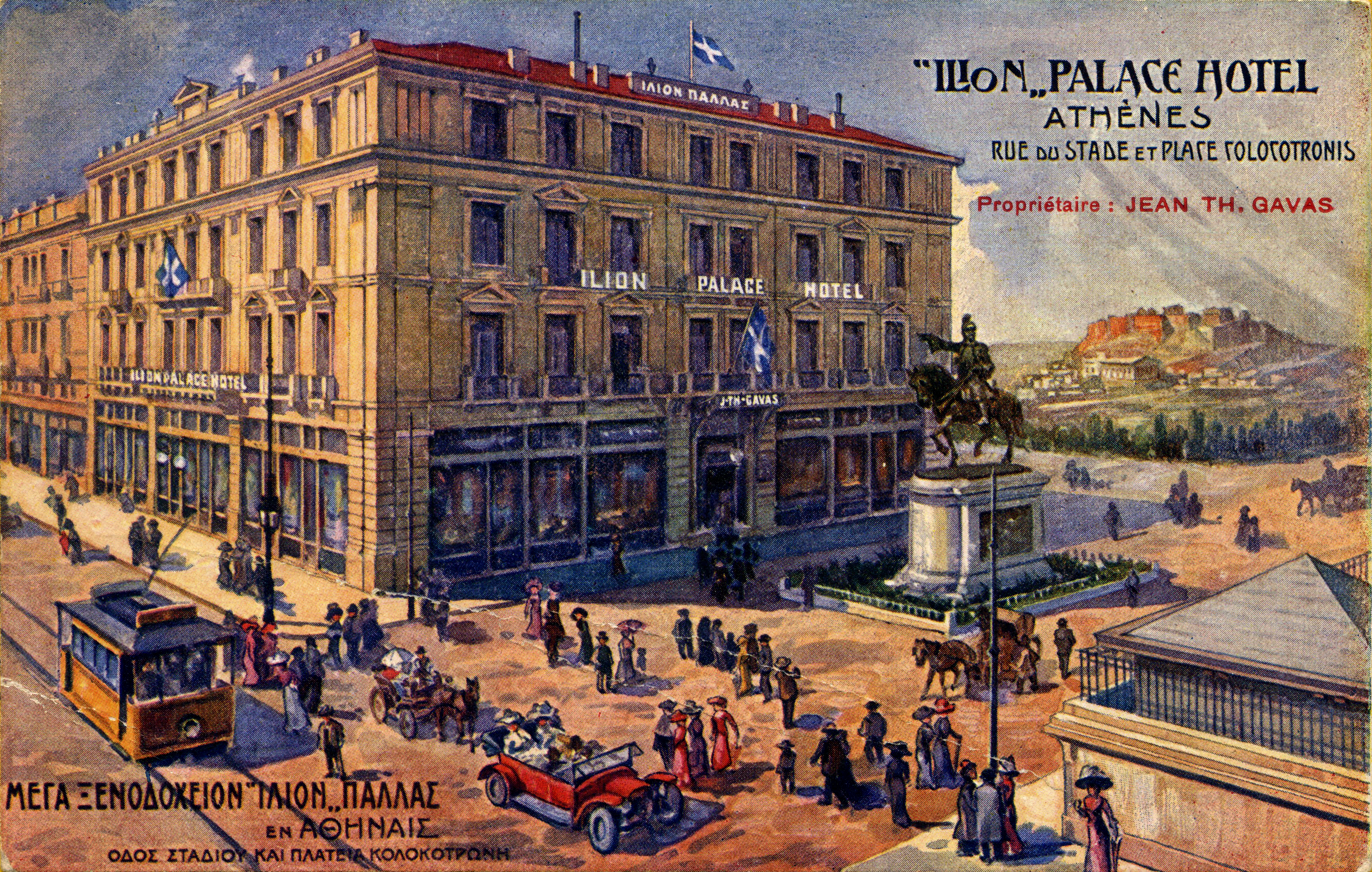
Ilion Palace Hotel in Athens, Greece, c. 1910

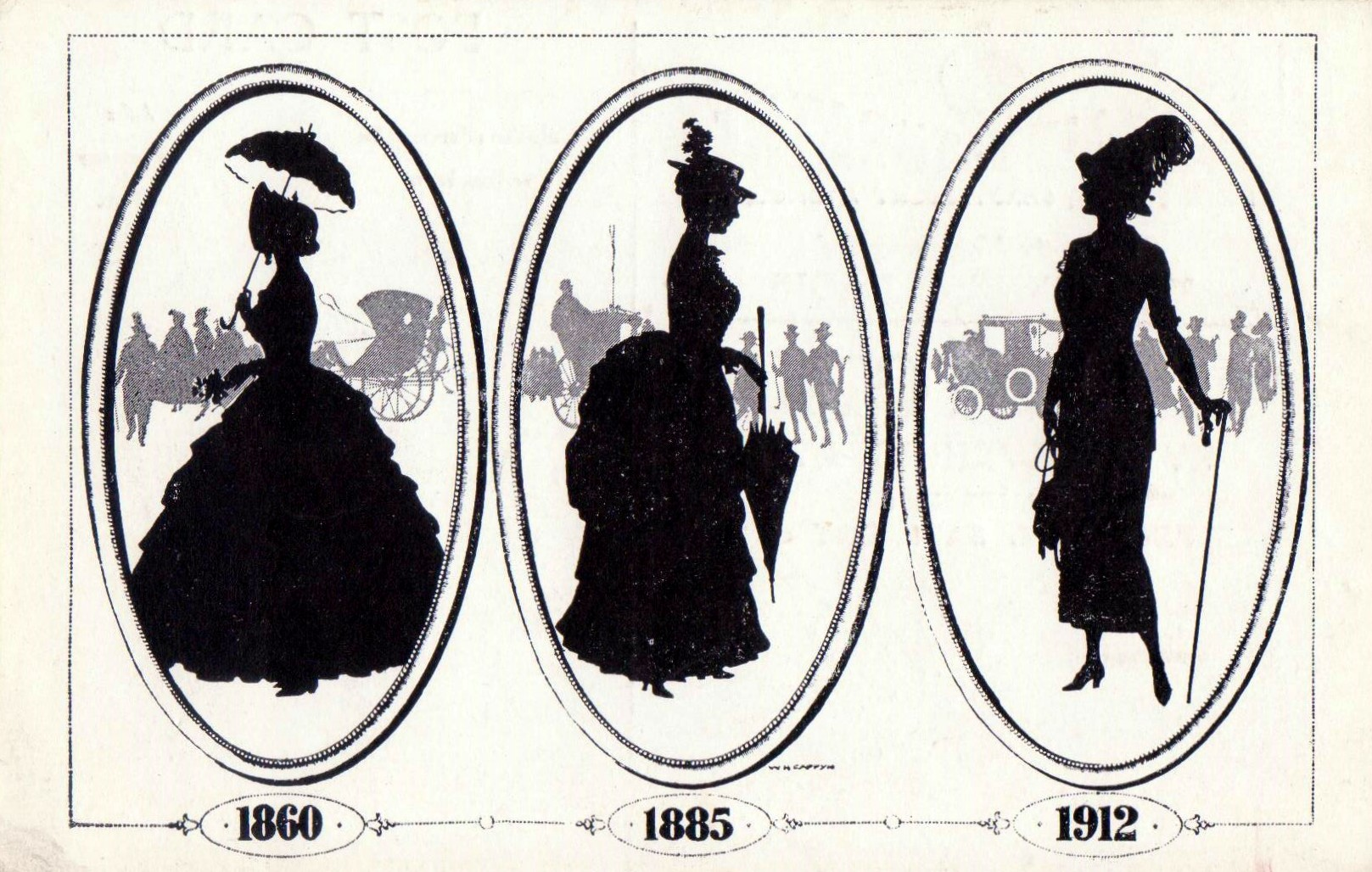
Royalty Theatre, London, 1912

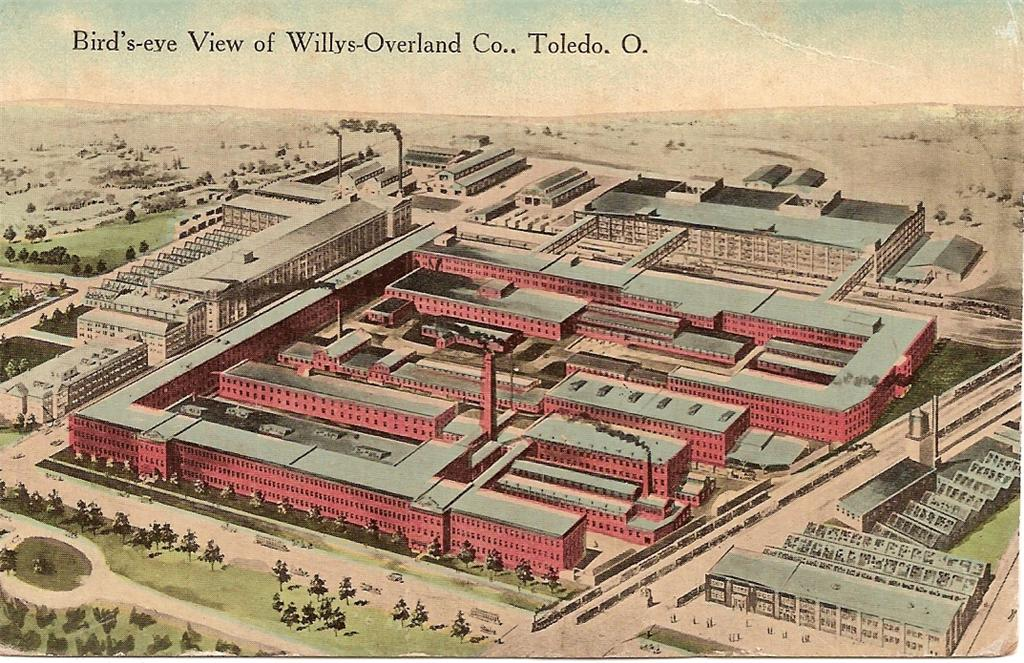
Willy's Overland Factory, Toledo, Ohio, 1915

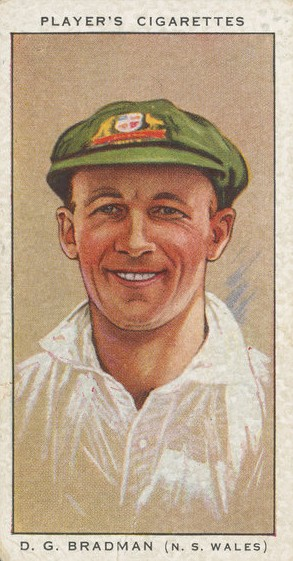
Players' Cigarette Card featuring Australian batsman, Donald Bradman, 1930s

== Types ==
While there are many different types of postcards, there are two broad types - those that are mailed to customers, possibly names drawn from a mailing list, and those that are distributed directly.

=== Direct-mail ===
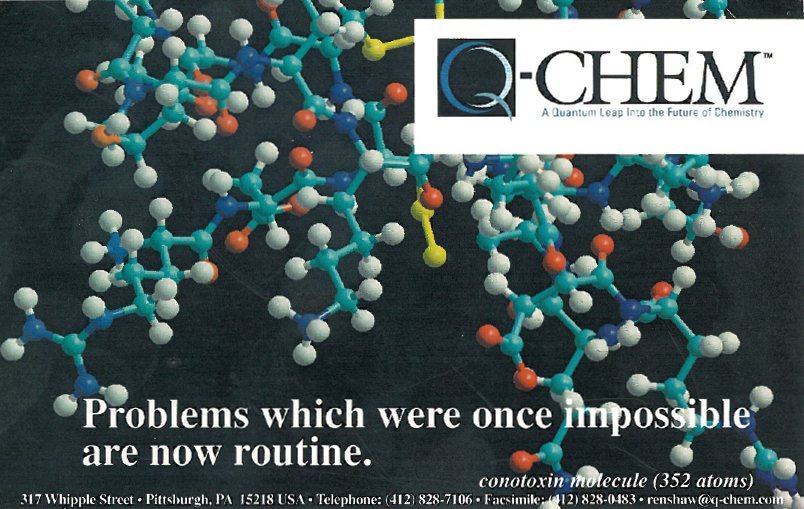
Early 21st century advertising postcard for Q-Chem, 2003

Though postcards have traditionally always been rectangular in shape, some postal authorities, such as Canada Post Corporation, may allow non-rectangular shaped cards to be mailed. This has given rise to new marketing concepts such as round postcards or cards specifically die cut to match the theme of a particular campaign.

=== Direct distribution ===
Advertising postcards are usually distributed by display on stands with patrons being encouraged to take them for free. These stands are typically situated in high traffic areas such as shopping malls, university campuses, public transport hubs and entertainment venues.

== Popular culture ==
Advertising postcards have been very popular with collectors since their inception in the 18th and 19th centuries. They straddle the boundary between "low art" and "high art" One scholar has described the 19th century penchant for collecting postcards as a "mania." Scholars have recently become interested in studying trade cards and advertising postcards as a means of understanding the emergent commercialization of consumption in the 18th century.

== See also ==
- Baseball card
- Corner card
- Cigarette cards
- Postcard
- Trade card
- Trading card
