= Exaggeration postcard =

Type of postcard

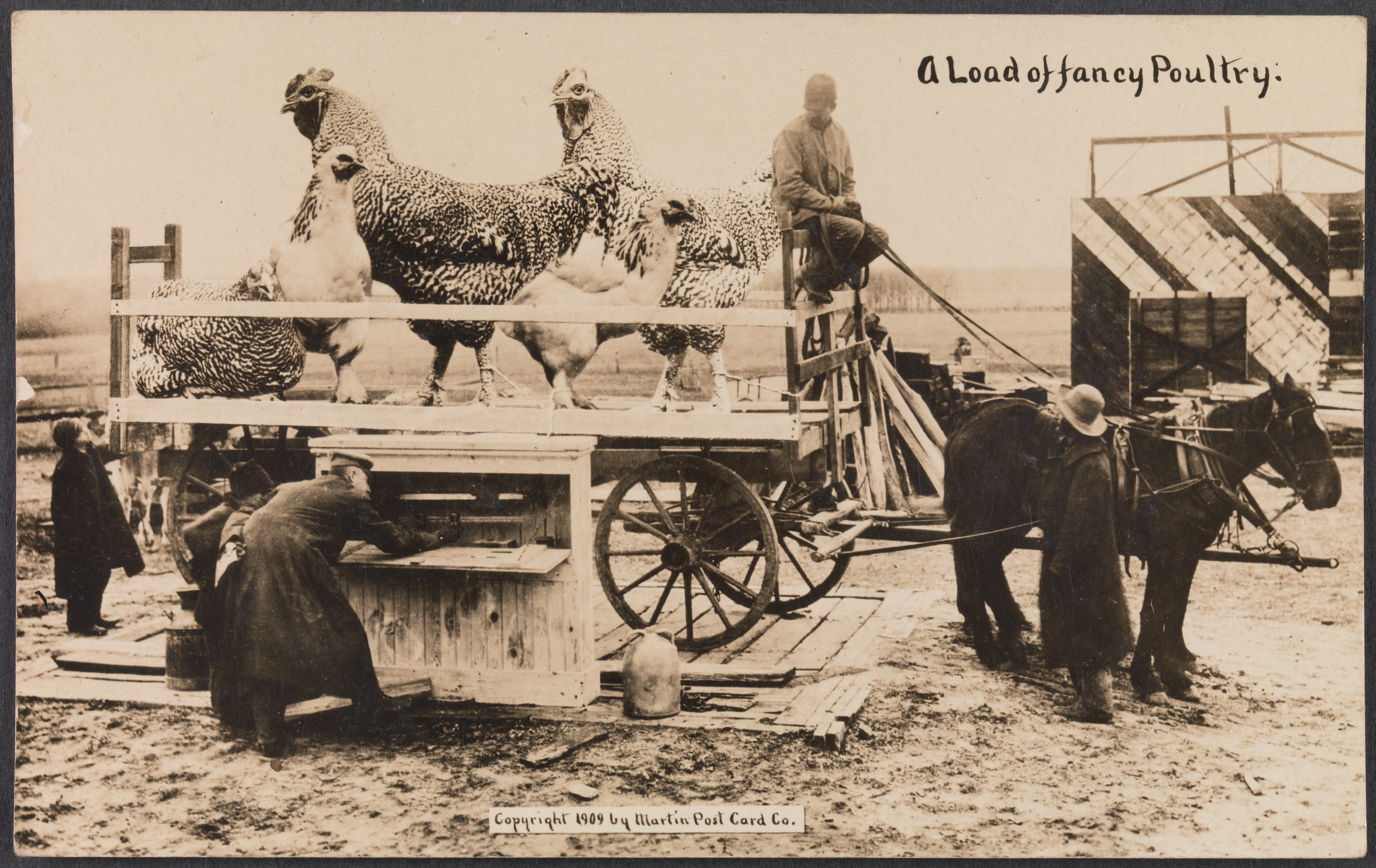
A Load of Fancy Poultry exaggeration postcard by William H. "Dad" Martin (1909)

Exaggeration postcards, also known as tall tale postcards, were postcards popular throughout North America, especially in the Great Plains region, during the early 20th century. These postcards would feature impossibly large animals and crops, often shown being carried by train or wagon, and would usually have some sort of caption to go along with them. Common themes of these postcards included giant fish being caught and massive crops being shown off, less common themes included mythical creatures such as the fur-bearing trout, and people riding oversized animals.

The postcards were often created using trick photography and photocomposition, and some were painted. Entire businesses and studios were created for their production, such as one ran by William H. Martin. The postcards remained popular until World War I, when the United States government banned German postcards. The production of exaggeration postcards slowly died out after that point, with some lasting until the 1960s.
