= E. A. Bishop Postcard Company =

American postcard publisher

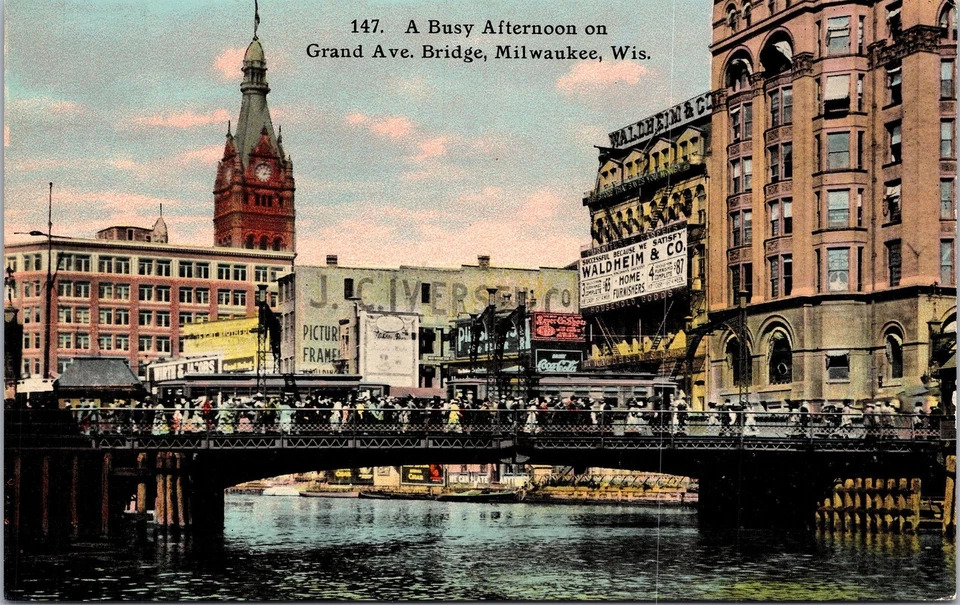
- 147. A Busy Afternoon on Grand Avenue Bridge, Milwaukee (ca. 1907-15)
- Status: defunct
- Founded: 1897 (129 years ago)
- Founder: Edward A. Bishop
- Defunct: 1951 (75 years ago)
- Country of origin: United States
- Headquarters location: Racine, Wisconsin
- Publication types: Postcards

The E. A. Bishop Postcard Company was an American postcard publishing company and wholesale business based in Racine, Wisconsin. The firm was particularly active during the first three decades of the 20th century, encompassing the period known as the golden age of postcards.

== History ==
Founded in 1897 by Edward A. Bishop (1859–1944), the company published picture postcards, photographic cards, souvenir booklets, and related products depicting Racine and other communities, landscapes, and subjects in Wisconsin and the upper Midwest. Edward A. Bishop was born Somers, Wisconsin, on February 18, 1859. He entered the printing trade as a young man and established his own business in Racine in 1897.

By the 1910s, Bishop had developed a substantial postcard enterprise. A 1916 Racine county history volume described him as an "importer, publisher and jobber of souvenir post cards and dealer in display stands and fixtures," with a trade extending throughout Wisconsin. Bishop remained associated with the company until his death on April 17, 1944. Management subsequently passed to his only son, Burnett Bishop (1884–1968). The company ceased operations in 1951, after approximately 54 years in business. It had become one of Wisconsin's most important publishers, with some estimates suggesting that 1.5 million individual postcards may have been produced or distributed by the firm during its existence.

== Production and subjects ==
Prominent subjects including streets and commercial districts; civic buildings and courthouses; churches, schools, and hospitals; factories and other industrial sites; parks, harbors, lakes, and rural landscapes; monuments and historic buildings; and idealized scenes of Wisconsin farm life. Although especially associated with Racine and nearby Milwaukee, Bishop's geographical market extended beyond the city. Surviving cards depict communities elsewhere in Wisconsin as well as locations in Illinois and other parts of the Midwest.

Some early Bishop cards are marked as made in Germany. German printers played a major role in the American postcard industry before the First World War because of their highly developed color-lithographic processes. Changes in tariffs and the disruption of German-American commerce during World War I contributed to the decline of German postcard production for the American market. Bishop subsequently worked with American manufacturers. Documentary and surviving postcard evidence demonstrates a relationship with firms like the Detroit Publishing Company (Detroit), Rotograph Co. (New York City), and Curt Teich & Co. (Chicago), the latter estimated to have produced 360,000 different images between 1898 and 1978, thousands of which were used by postcard publishers.

Bishop's surviving catalogue also illustrates the widespread postcard-industry practice of reusing and repurposing photographic images. Some postcards appeared more than once under different catalogue numbers. Other rural scenes were similarly reissued with references to Wisconsin removed, apparently allowing the images to be marketed as generic American farm scenes.

== Gallery of postcards by E. A. Bishop ==
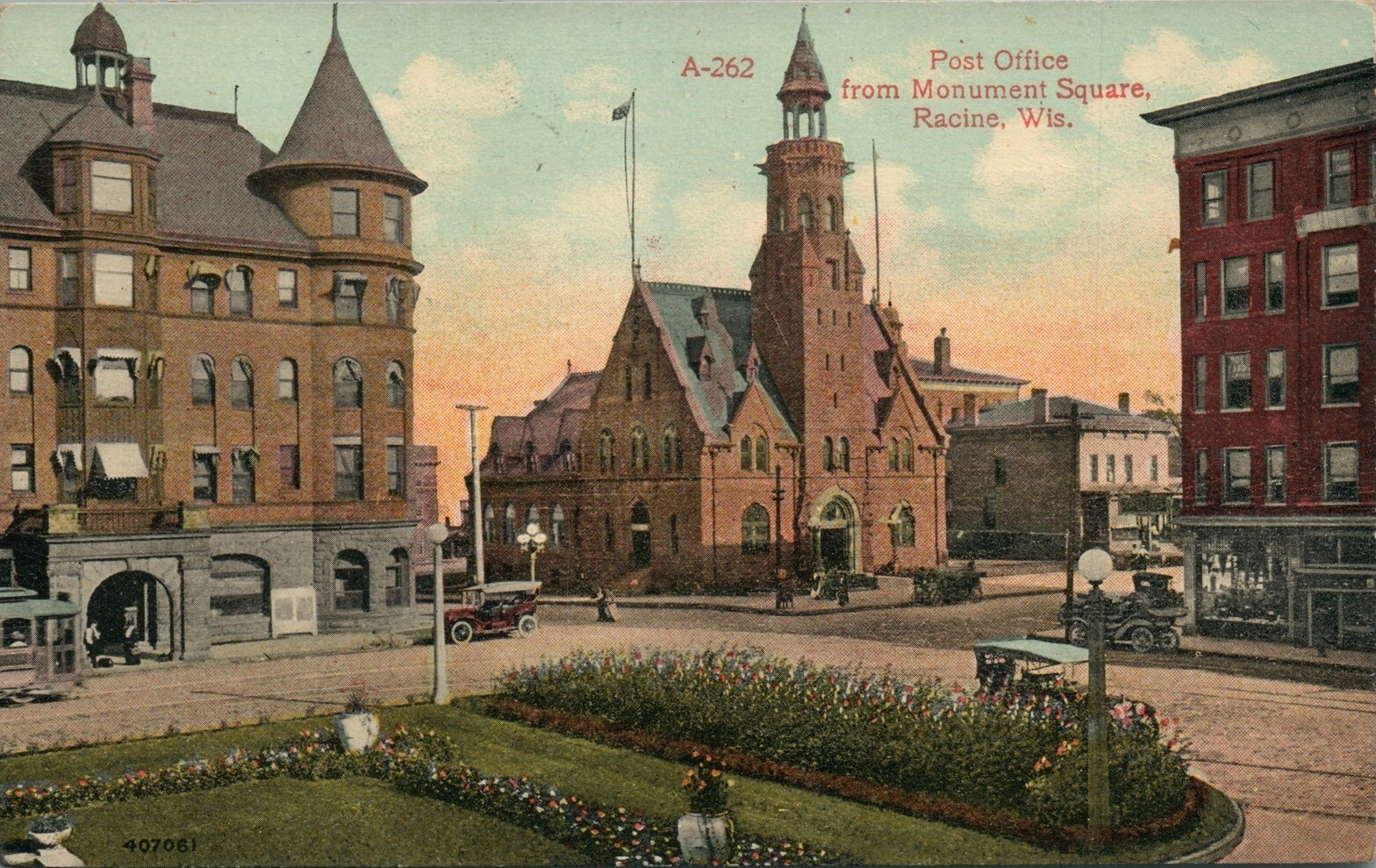
A-262. Post Office from Monument Square, Racine, ca. 1907-15

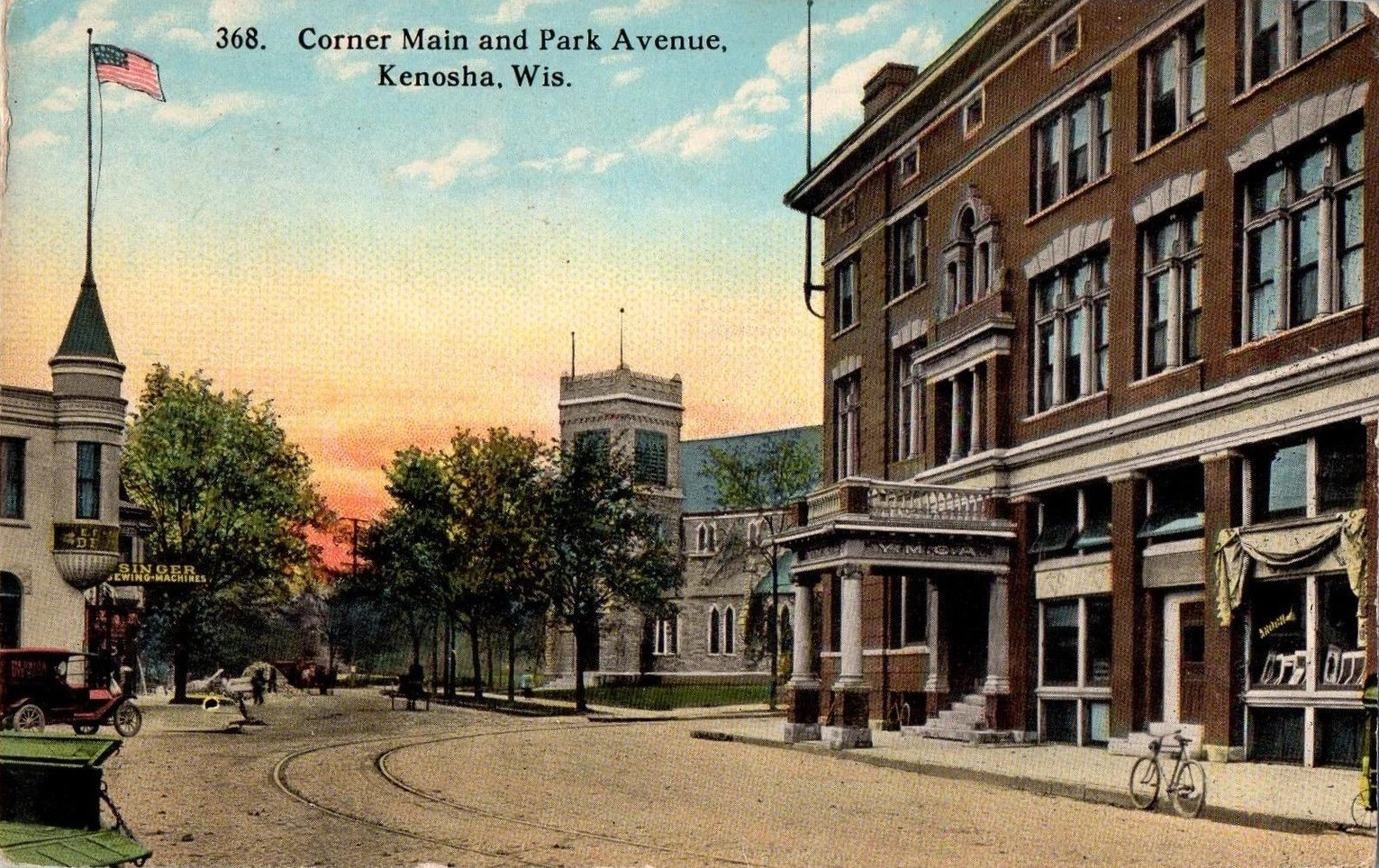
368. Corner of Main and Park Avenue, Kenosha, ca. 1907-15

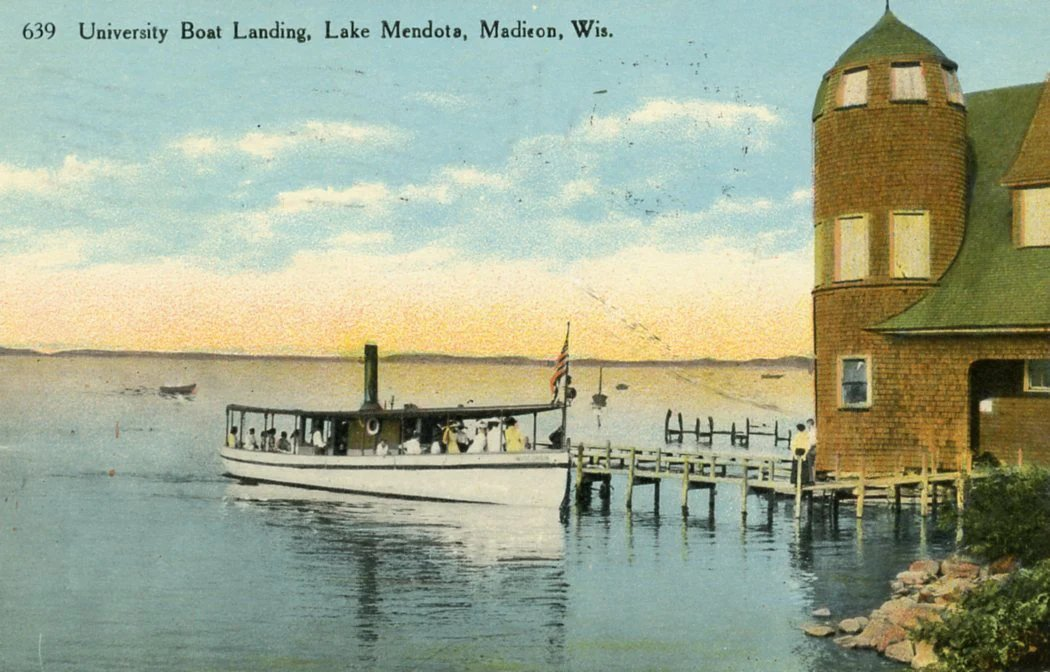
639. University Boat Landing, Lake Mendota, Madison, Wisconsin, ca. 1907-15

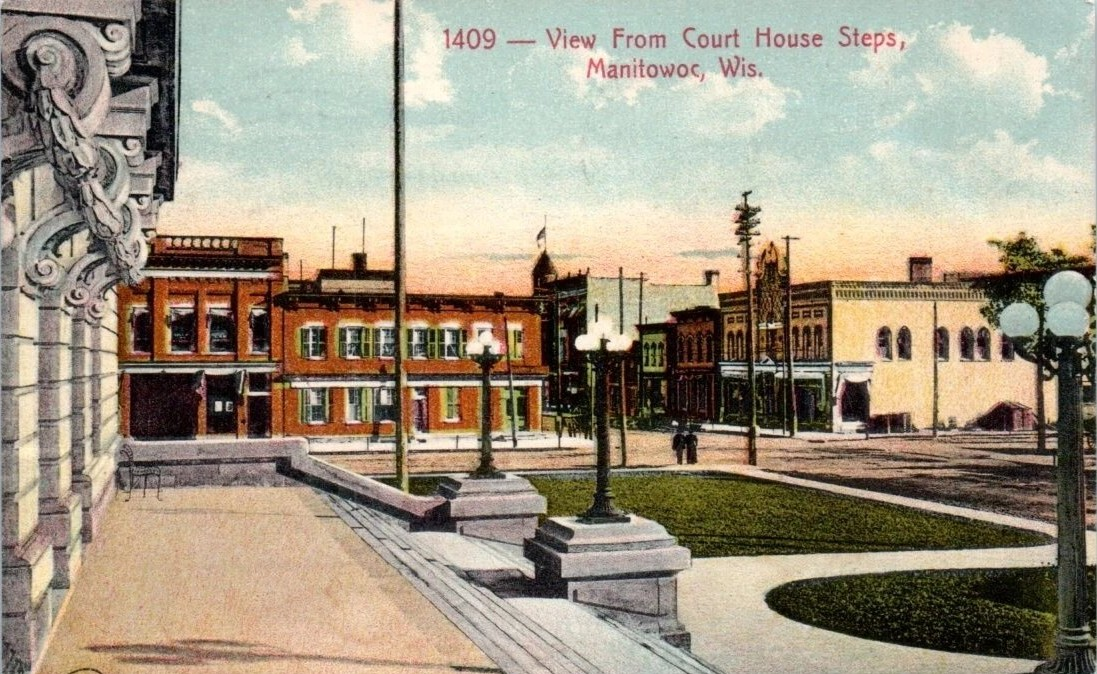
1409. View from Court House Steps, Manitowoc, ca. 1907-15

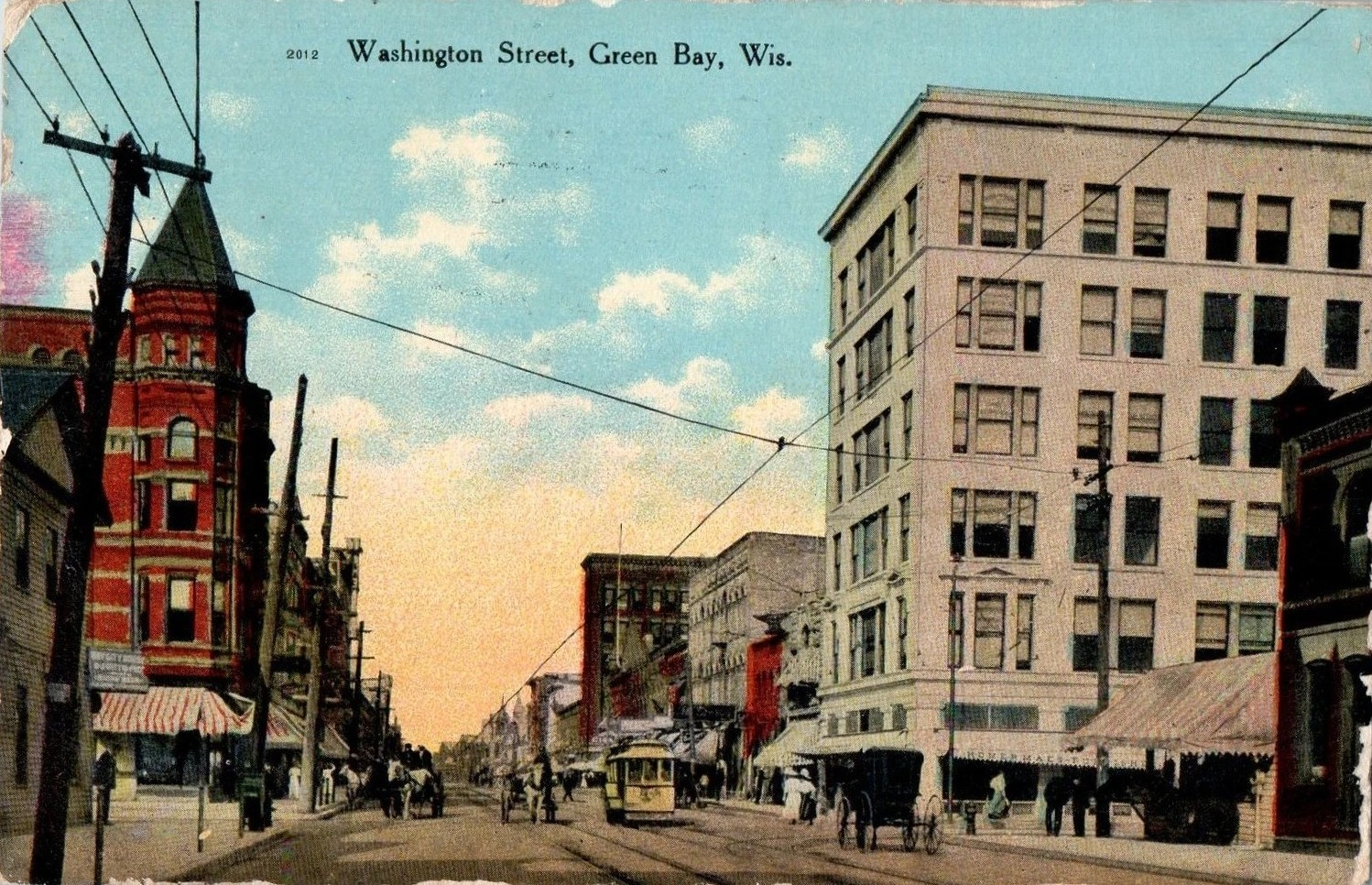
2012. Washington Street, Green Bay, ca. 1907-15

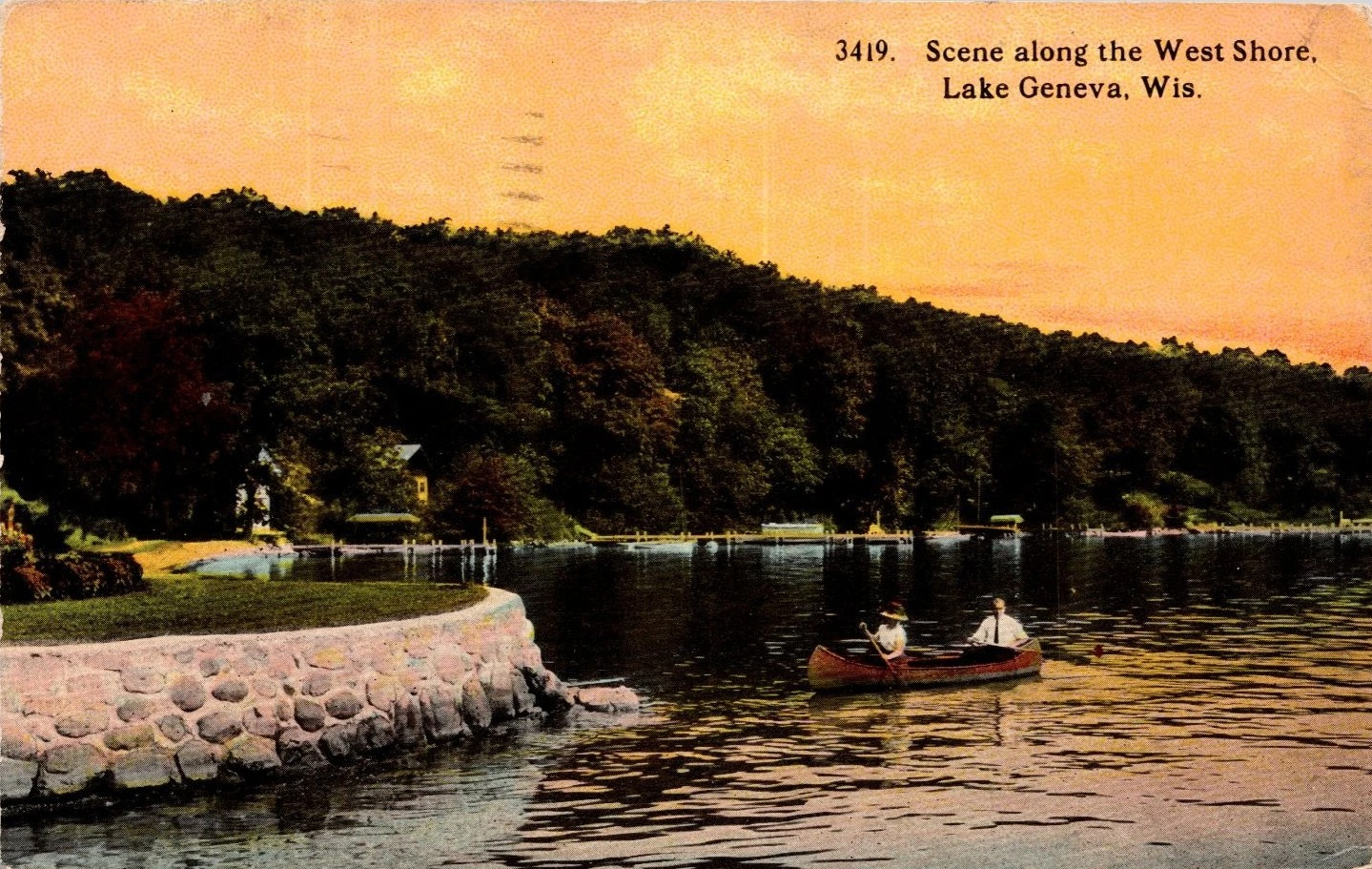
3419. Scene Along the West Shore, Lake Geneva, ca. 1907-15

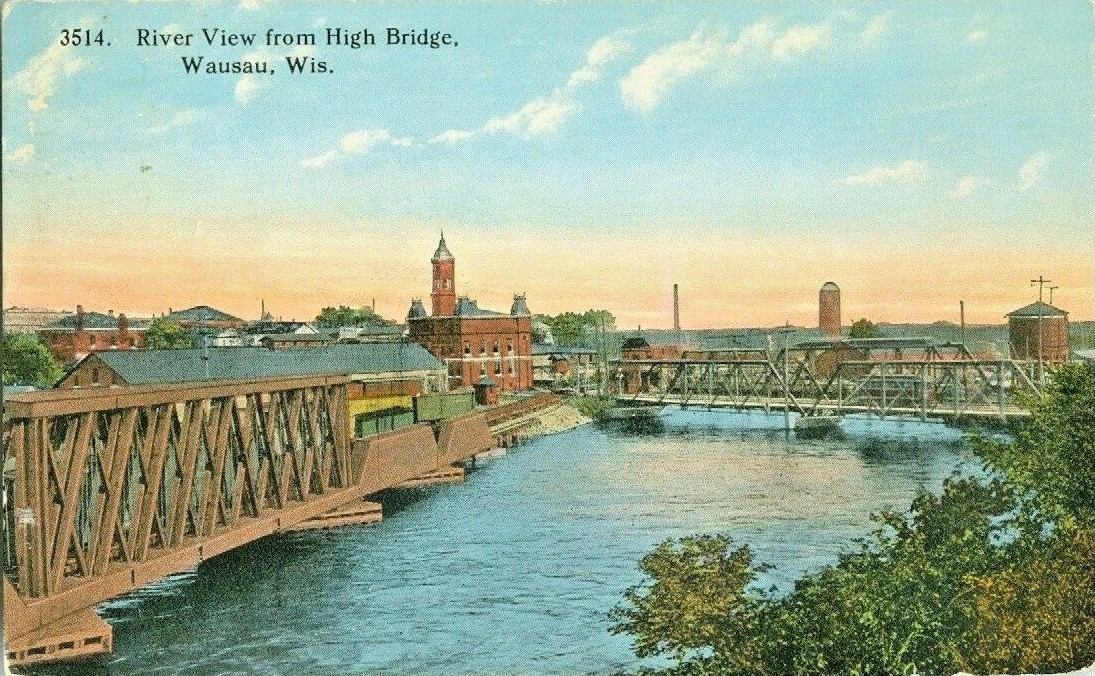
3514. River View from High Bridge, Wausau, ca. 1907-15

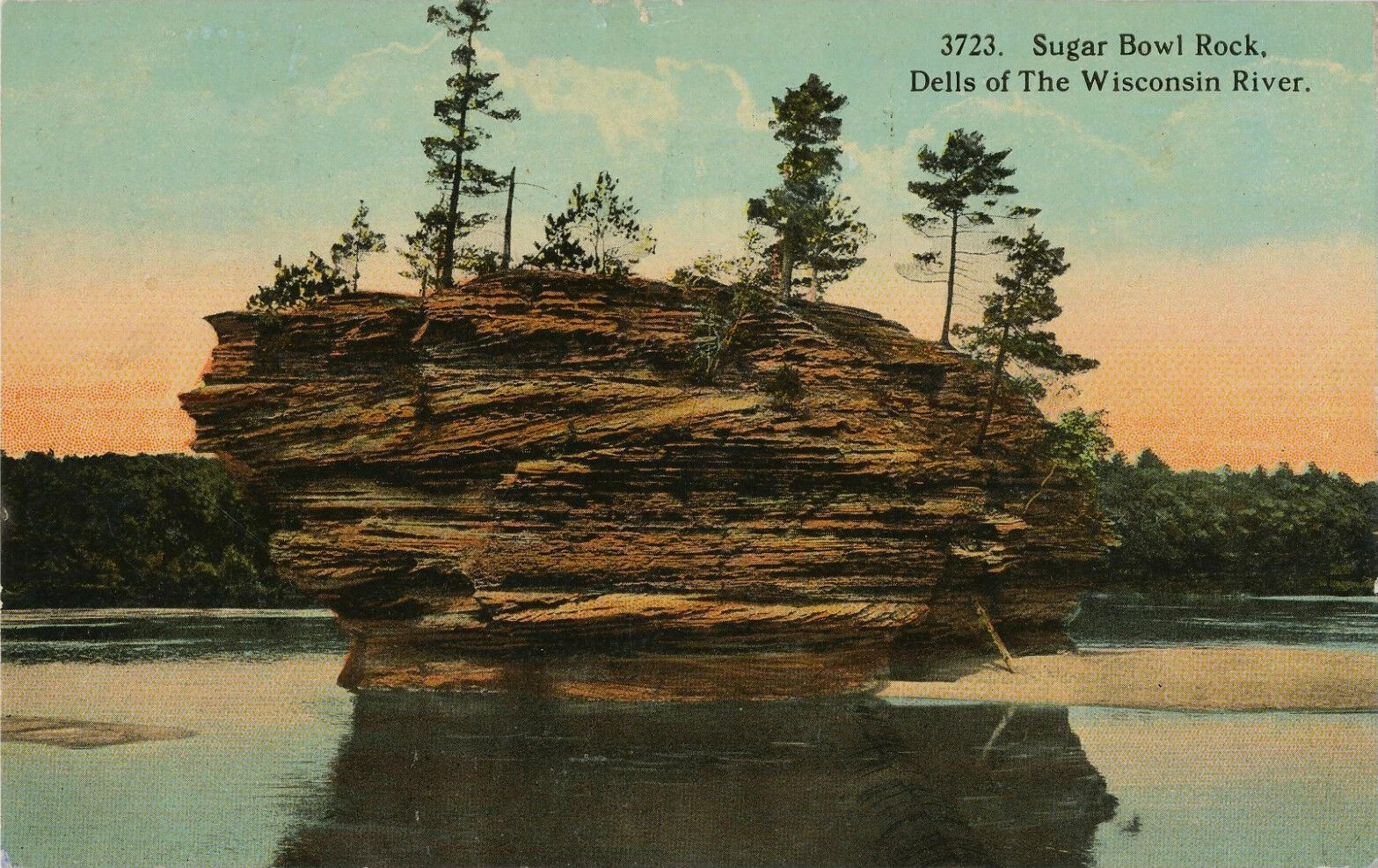
3723. Sugar Bowl Rock, Dells of the Wisconsin River, ca. 1907-15

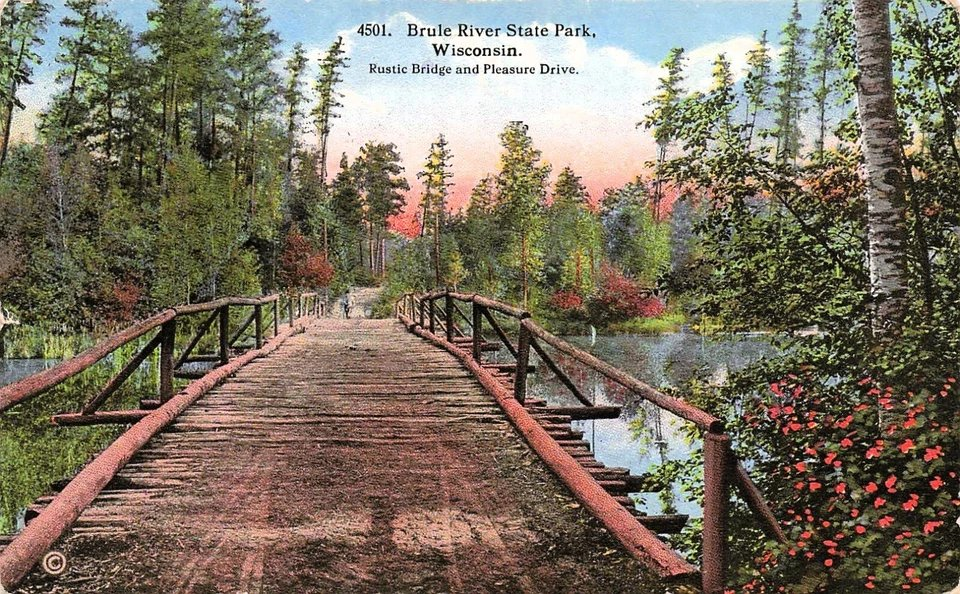
4501. Brule River State Park, Rustic Bridge and Pleasure Drive, ca. 1907-15

== See also ==
- History of postcards in the United States
- Deltiology
- Curt Teich & Co.
- History of Racine, Wisconsin
