= History of postcards in the United States =

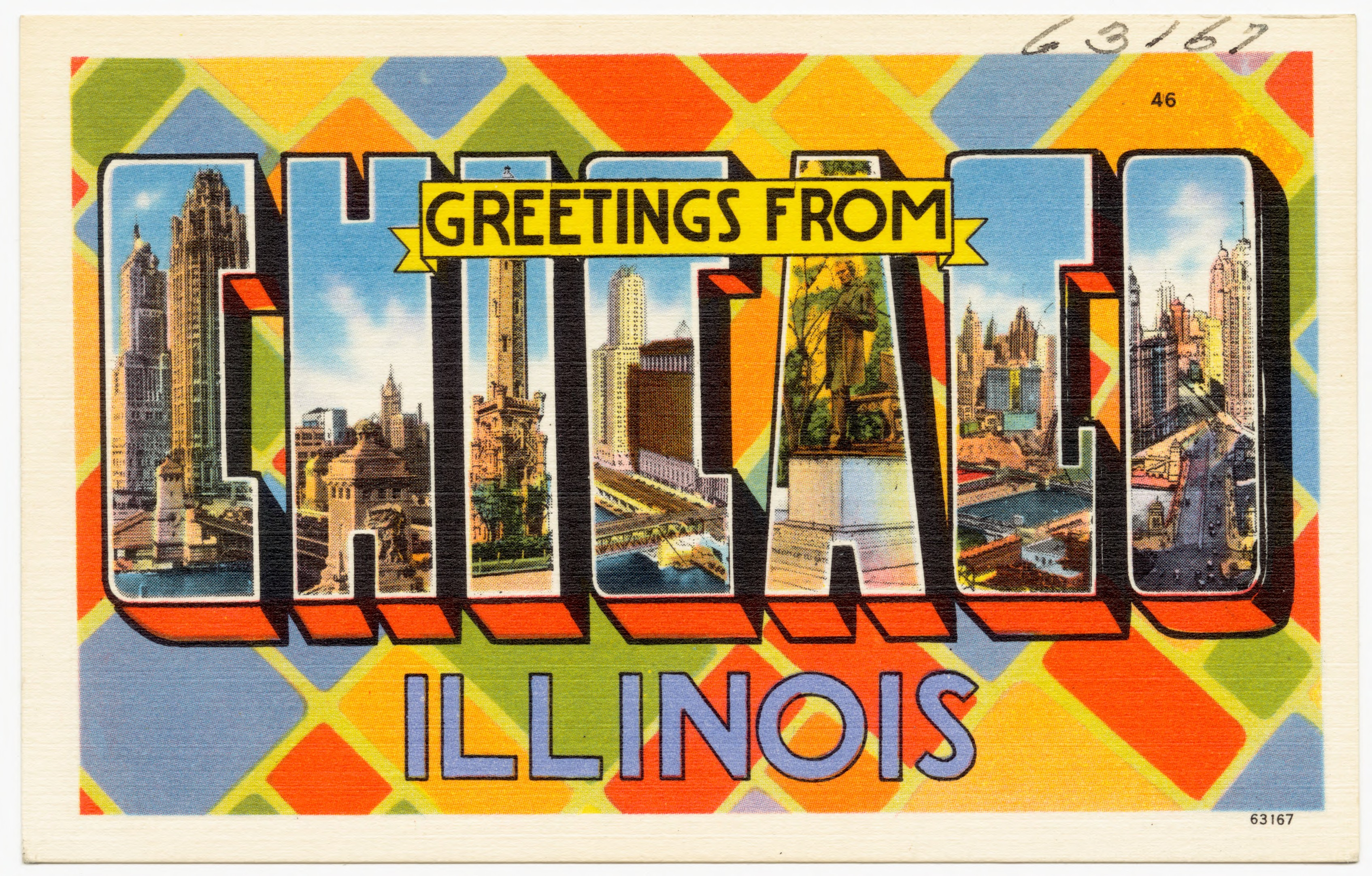
"Greetings from Chicago, Illinois" large-letter postcard produced by Curt Teich

The history of postcards is part of the cultural history of the United States. Especially after 1900, "the postcard was wildly successful both as correspondence and collectible" and thus postcards are valuable sources for cultural historians as both a form of epistolary literature and for the bank of cultural imagery included in the postcard illustrations reflecting historic popular culture norms and tropes. Postcards are also valuable resources for scholars of architectural and regional history.

== Postcard eras ==
There are several common motifs present in American postcard design, most shaped by production practices and laws in place at the time of production. These have been identified by deltiologists and grouped together into what are commonly referred to as eras or periods which describe a postcard's style or method of production. While features of these eras, such as a divided back, are present in other countries as well, the dates of production may differ. For example, "divided back" postcards were introduced to Great Britain in 1902, five years before the United States. The "golden age" of postcards is commonly defined in the United States as starting around 1905, peaking between 1907 and 1910, and ending in World War I. Listed here are eras of production for specific types of postcards, as typically defined by deltiologists. Most of the dates are not fixed dates, but approximate points in time—as there was an overlap in production. These will be further elaborated upon in the following sections.

- Pioneer, 1870–1898
  - Alternate start dates include 1873 (first government postal issued) and 1893 (World's Columbian Exposition)
- Private Mailing Card‚ 1898–1901
- Undivided Back‚ 1901–1907
  - Occasionally called the "Post Card" era
- Divided Back‚ 1907–1915
- White Border‚ 1915–1930
- Linen‚ 1930–1945
- Photochrom(e)‚ 1939–present

Others styles of postcards have fairly established dates of production as well. These are not typically referred to as eras, as they were never the predominant type at any given time.

- Real Photo‚ 1903–present
  - Began with the introduction of a Kodak camera in 1903
- Leather‚ 1900–1909
  - References to "leather postals" and "leather post cards" began to appear in newspapers across the United States in late 1904 and were in popular use by Valentine's Day of 1905.

== History ==
=== Pioneer era ===
Under an act passed by the U.S. Congress on February 27, 1861, privately printed cards (which weighed one ounce or less) were allowed to be sent by mail. John P. Charlton copyrighted the first postcard in America that same year. The rights to this card were later sold to Hymen L. Lipman, who began reissuing the cards under his name in 1870. The U.S. Postmaster General John Creswell recommended to the U.S. Congress one-cent postal cards in November 1870. Legislation was passed on June 8, 1872, which allowed the government to produce postal cards.

By law, only government-issued postcards were allowed to say "Postal Card". Privately printed postcards were still allowed but they were more expensive to mail (two-cent postage versus one-cent for government cards). Backs of these private cards typically contained the words "Correspondence Card", "Mail Card" or "Souvenir Card" The Morgan Envelope Factory of Springfield, Massachusetts, claims to have produced the first American postcard in 1873.

Political hold-ups including concerns by future President James Garfield (the Representative), delayed issuance of the official government postal. Finally, it was issued in May 1873, and first went on sale in Springfield, Massachusetts on May 12 of that year. According to The New York Times, postal clerks in the city sold 200,000 cards within 2.5 hours on May 14. Nationwide, 31 million postal cards were sold by the end of June 1873, and more than 64 million by the end of September. The numbers only continued to grow through 1910.

==== World's fairs ====
There were many world's fairs and expositions held across the United States in the late 19th and early 20th centuries. The first to be depicted in an early advertising postcard was the Interstate Industrial Exposition that took place in Chicago in 1873. As that exposition card was not intended to be a souvenir, the first postcard to be printed explicitly as a souvenir in the United States was created for the 1893 World's Columbian Exposition, also in Chicago. There were 120 different images of the exposition printed on government postals by private distributors. Among the most popular, was Charles W. Goldsmith's set of ten postcard designs (in full color) showing the exposition buildings. Governmental postal cards, and private souvenir cards featuring buildings and exposition grounds remained popular staples of future expositions.

One large mix-up occurred at the 1895 Cotton States and International Exposition in Atlanta. All of the postcards there were printed on plain card stock, so most people assumed they were government-issued postals requiring one cent for postage instead of two. The incident made the headlines.

=== Golden age of postcards ===
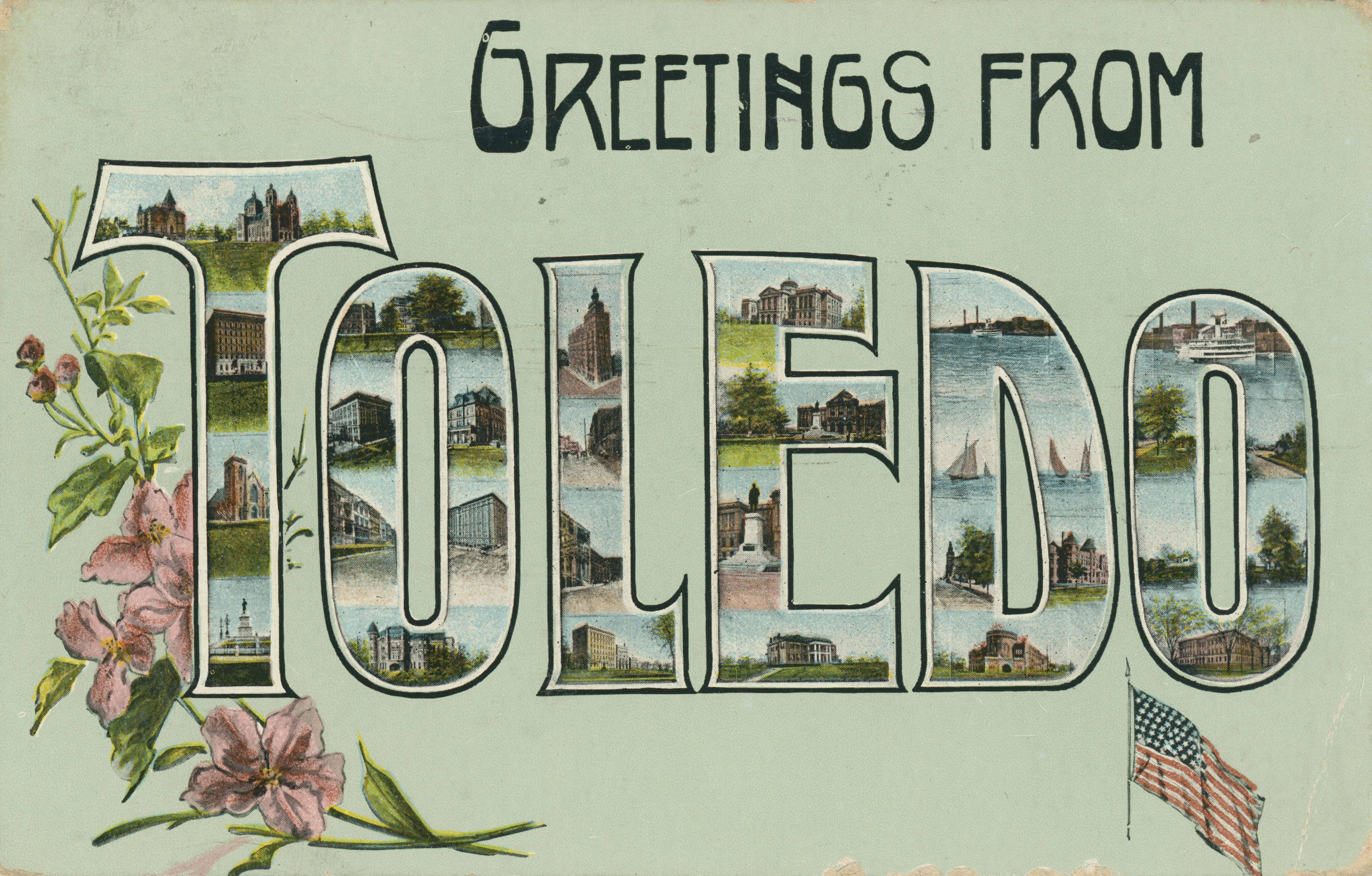
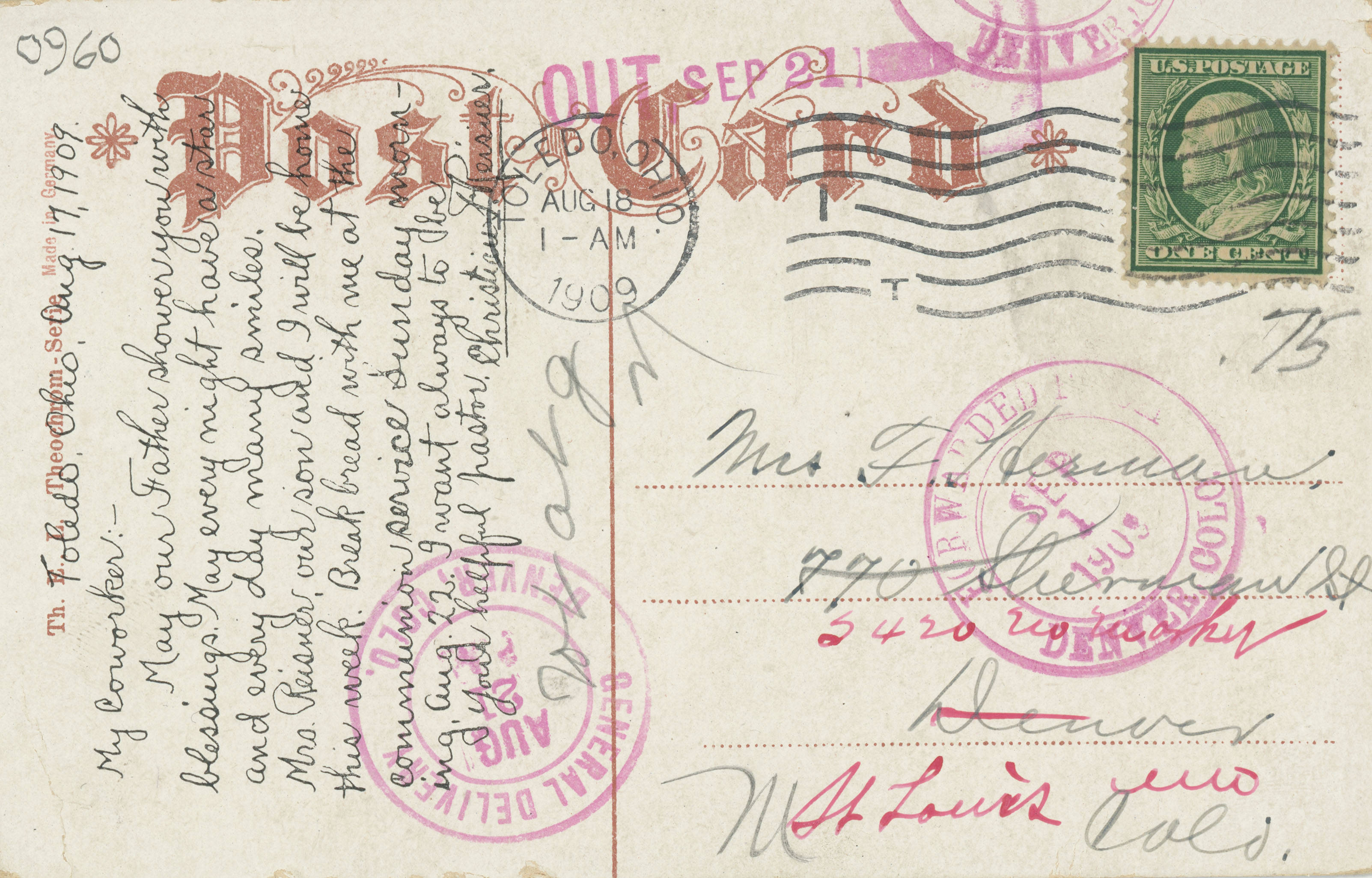
A 1909 postcard from Toledo, Ohio

The U.S. Congress passed an act on May 19, 1898, which allowed private printers and publishers to officially produce postcards, and for them to be posted at the same rate as government-produced postals (one-cent, previously two). Until this time, privately printed cards bore the terms "Correspondence Card", "Mail Card" or "Souvenir Card". The act now required private cards to state "Private Mailing Card, Authorized by Act of Congress of May 19, 1898". Hence, deltiologists have referred to this as the "Private Mailing Card Act".

This prohibition on verbiage was rescinded on December 24, 1901, by the Postmaster-General, who issued Post Office Order No. 1447. It allowed private postcards to use the term "Post Card" on their backs. The order also shortened the requirement and allowed private publishers to omit the citation to the 1898 act. Still, correspondents could only write on the front of the postcard, the back was reserved for the recipient's address. This has become known as the "undivided back" era of postcards.

The Universal Postal Congress decreed that government-issued postcards in the United States could contain messages on the address side beginning March 1, 1907. In line with these changes, the United States Congress passed an act on March 1, 1907, which extended this to privately produced cards. These laws were further tweaked by orders of the U.S. Postmaster-General that same year. This ushered in the "divided back" era of postcards, which lasted until World War I. On these cards the back is divided into two sections: the left section is used for the message and the right for the address.

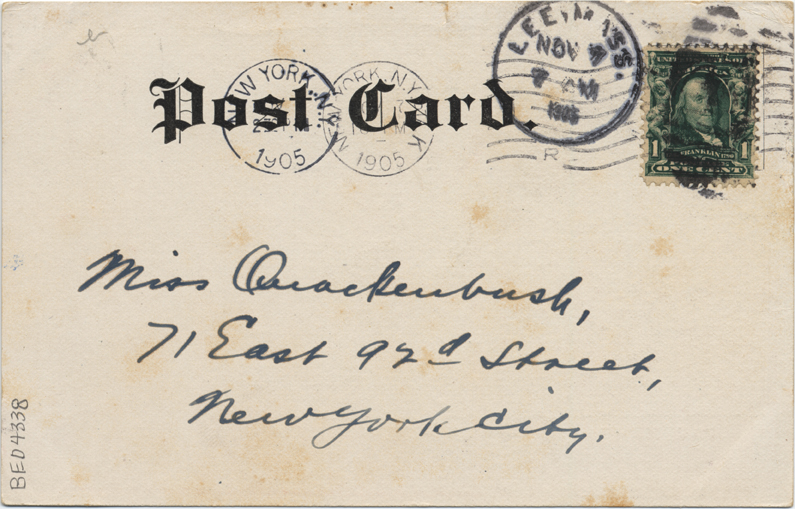
1905 postcard with 'undivided back'

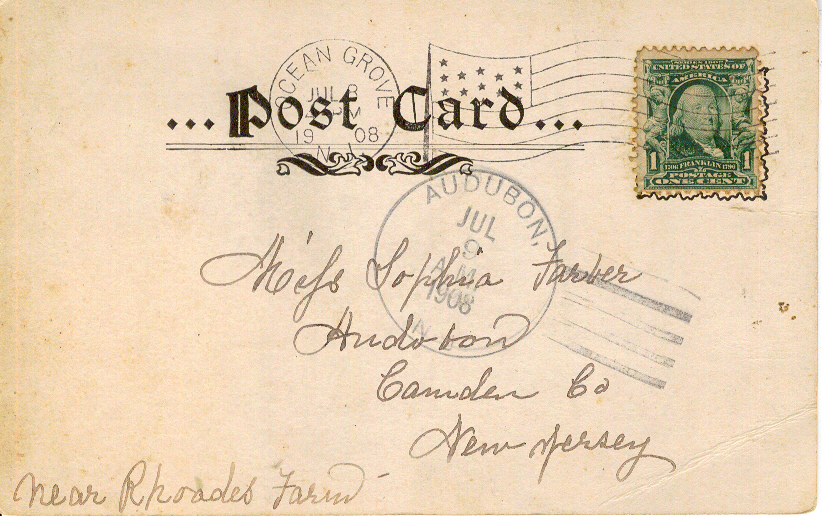
Postcard with 1908 cancellation

Thus began the "golden age" of American postcards, which roughly spanned from 1905 to the First World War. Others define the "Golden Age" as aligning more closely with the "divided back" era. Regardless, it peaked between 1907 and 1910, and started to decline with the introduction of tariffs on German-printed postcards in 1909. The postcard craze between 1907 and 1910 was particularly popular among rural and small-town women in Northern U.S. states. Many social, economic, and governmental factors combined to create the postcard boom. Demand for postcards increased, government restrictions on production loosened, and technological advances (in photography, printing, and mass production) made it possible. In addition, the expansion of Rural Free Delivery allowed mail to be delivered to more American households than ever before. Other factors included shifts in artistic taste among the public, and the development of a sale and distribution network of jobbers and importers—connecting Main Street America with German printers. Billions of postcards were posted during the golden age, with nearly 700 million postcards mailed during the year ending June 30, 1908, alone.

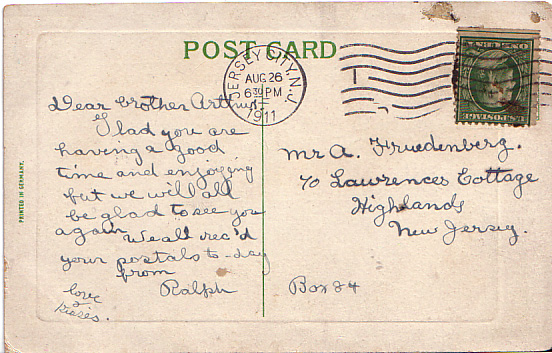
American 'divided back' postcard, 1916

The decline began with the Payne-Aldrich Tariff Act of 1909, which was mostly lobbied for by American publishers who did not wish to compete with German publishers. By some estimates, the new tariffs on postcards were an increase of 300 percent. Many distributors imported large quantities of German-produced cards before the tariffs took effect, causing a glut in the market. German publishers began moving production to the United States shortly after the Payne-Aldrich Tariff Act to keep selling to the American market. Ultimately, the tariffs contributed to the end of the "golden age" as publishing quality decreased (American technology lagged behind German), and as public interest in collecting waned. The National Postcard Association was formed to combat unfair practices, low prices, and an excessive amount of unsalable postcards. Effects of the tariffs were reinforced by the British naval blockade of German merchant ships at the outbreak of World War I in 1914. Postcard manufacturers called off their annual conventions that year, and many shifted to greeting card production. The war cut off the importation of fine German-produced cards as well as dyes used for ink—which were largely produced by the German Empire. Production of some postcards would continue during the war, to support propaganda efforts and troop morale.

=== Post-World War I ===
In response to the war-time shortages of ink, and the restrictions placed on importation, American publishers began producing larger quantities of postcards which featured a white border on the edges. Although these were seen occasionally prior to the war, this design change allowed publishers to save ink and lowered the precision threshold for cutting the cards. The "white border" era would last from about 1913 to 1930. During this period, public tastes had changed and publishers began focusing more on scenic views, humor, fashion, and surrealism.

Mid-century "linen" postcards were produced in great quantity from 1930 to 1945, although they continued to be produced more than a decade after the introduction of Photochrom cards. Despite the name, "linen" postcards were not produced on a linen fabric, but used newer printing processes that used an inexpensive card stock with a high rag content, and were then finished with a pattern which resembled linen. The face of the cards is distinguished by a textured cloth appearance which makes them easily recognizable. The reverse of the card is smooth, like earlier postcards. The rag content in the card stock allowed a much more colorful and vibrant image to be printed than the earlier "white border" style. Due to the inexpensive production and bright realistic images they became popular.

One of the better known "linen-era" postcard manufacturers was Curt Teich and Company, who first produced the immensely popular "large letter linen" postcards (among many others). The card design featured a large letter spelling of a state or place with smaller photos inside the letters. The design can still be found in many places today. Other manufacturers include Tichnor and Company, Haynes, Stanley Piltz, E.C. Kropp, and the Asheville Postcard Company. Cards printed by Curt Teich and Company typically included production numbers in the stamp box, which can be used for dating.

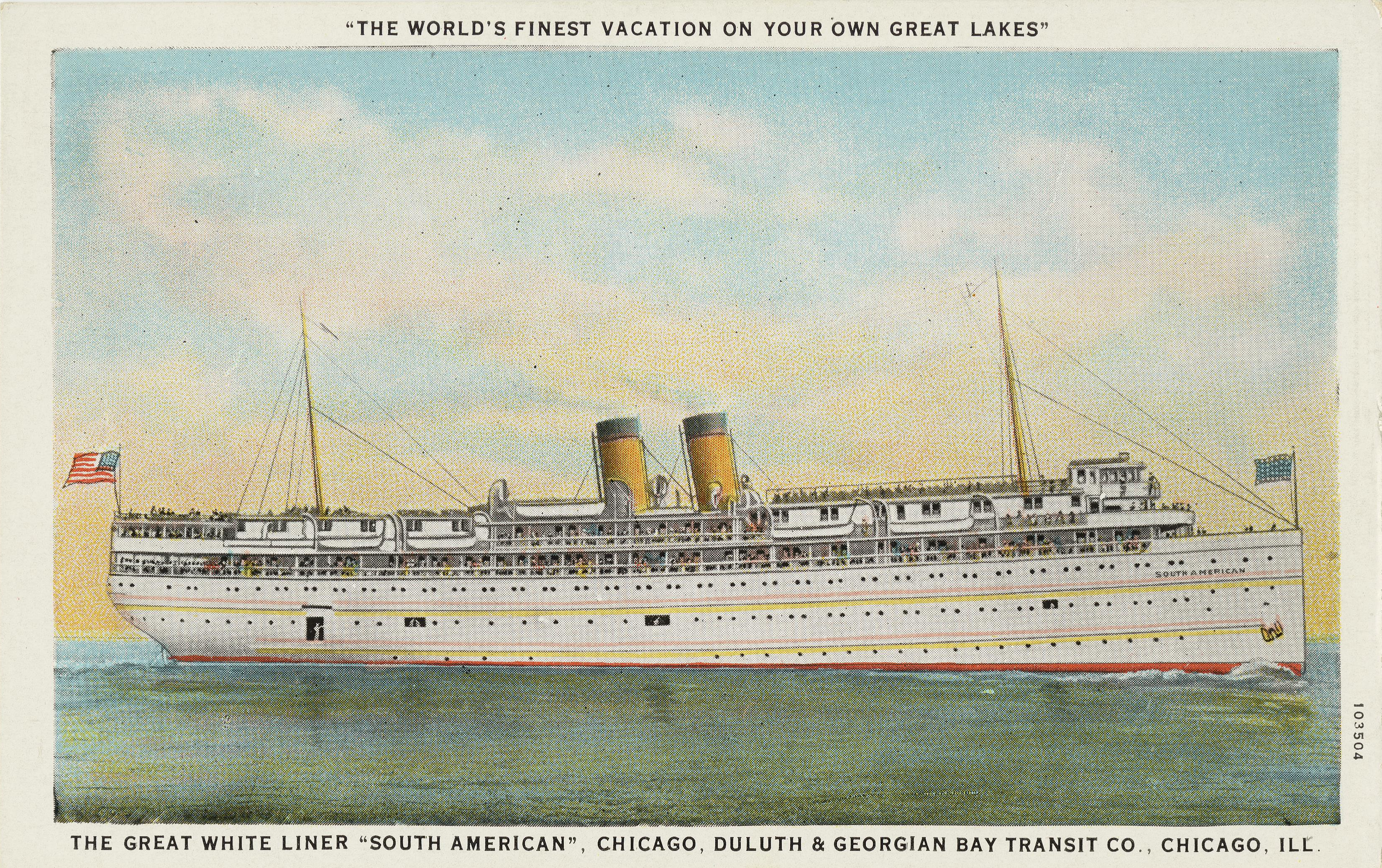
The Great White Liner "South American," Chicago, Illinois, circa 1915–1930. Curt Teich & Co. postcard 103504.

By the late 1920s new colorants had been developed that were very enticing to the printing industry. Though they were best used as dyes to show off their brightness, this proved to be problematic. Where traditional pigment based inks would lie on a paper's surface, these thinner watery dyes had a tendency to be absorbed into a paper's fibers, where it lost its advantage of higher color density, leaving behind a dull blurry finish. To experience the rich colors of dyes light must be able to pass through them to excite their electrons. A partial solution was to combine these dyes with petroleum distillates, leading to faster drying heatset inks. But it was Curt Teich who finally solved the problem by embossing paper with a linen texture before printing. The embossing created more surface area, which allowed the new heatset inks to dry even faster. The quicker drying time allowed these dyes to remain on the paper's surface, thus retaining their superior strength, which give Linens their telltale bright colors. In addition to printing with the usual CMYK colors, a lighter blue was sometimes used to give the images extra punch. Higher speed presses could also accommodate this method, leading to its widespread use. Although first introduced in 1931, their growing popularity was interrupted by the outbreak of war. They were not to be printed in numbers again until the later 1940s, when the war effort ceased consuming most of the country's resources. Even though the images on linen cards were based on photographs, they contained much handwork of the artists who brought them into production. There is of course nothing new in this; what it notable is that they were to be the last postcards to show any touch of the human hand on them. In their last days, many were published to look more like photo-based chrome cards that began to dominate the market. Textured papers for postcards had been manufactured ever since the turn of the century. But since this procedure was not then a necessary step in aiding card production, its added cost kept the process limited to a handful of publishers. Its original use most likely came from attempts to simulate the texture of canvas, thus relating the postcard to a painted work of fine art.

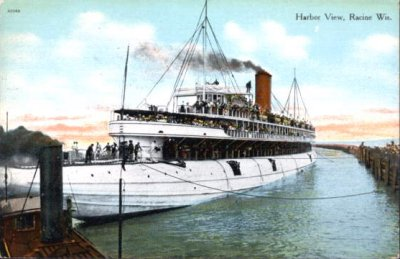
A tinted (black-and-white image that has had colored tint added) souvenir card. Image of the Christopher Columbus taken circa 1896.

=== World War II to present ===
The last and current postcard era, which began about 1939, is the "chrome" era, a shortened version of Photochrom (without the 'e' in American English; with in British English). However these types of cards did not begin to dominate until about 1950 (partially due to war shortages during WWII). The images on these cards are generally based on colored photographs, and are readily identified by the glossy appearance given by the paper's coating. "These still photographs made the invisible visible, the unnoticed noticed, the complex simple and the simple complex. The power of the still photograph forms symbolic structures and make the image a reality", as Elizabeth Edwards wrote in her book, The Tourist Image: Myths and Myth Making in Tourism.

== See also ==
- Large-letter postcard
- Lynching postcard
- Coon card
