= Emanuel Herrmann =

Austrian economist and inventor (1839–1902)

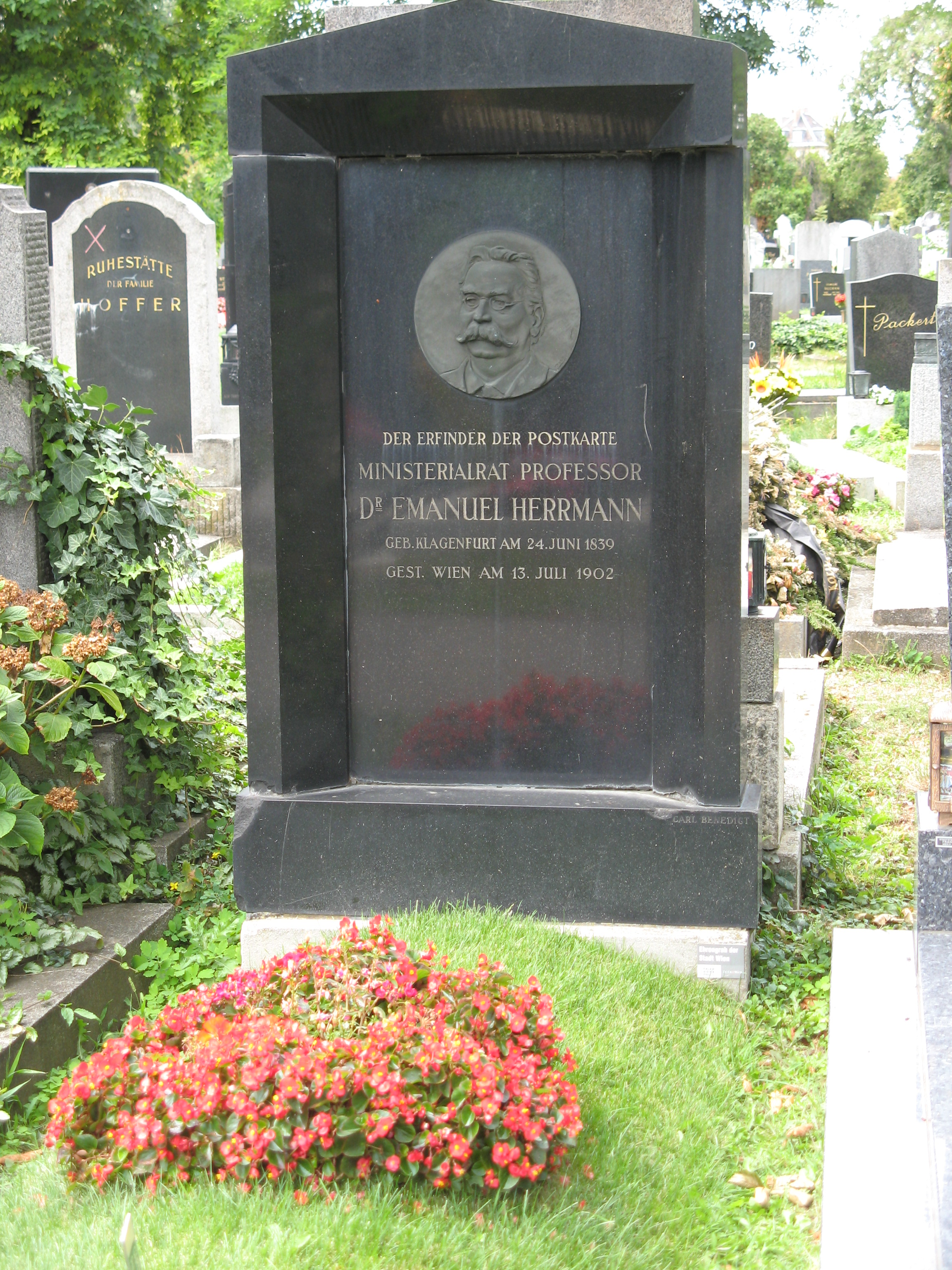
Grave of Emanuel Herrmann. Inscription (in German): "The Inventor of the Postal card"

Emanuel Alexander Herrmann (24 June 1839 in Klagenfurt, Austria – 13 July 1902 in Vienna) was an Austrian national economist. He is considered the decisive last in an international line of inventors of the postal card.

== Life and work ==
After graduating with a law doctorate from the University of Vienna, Emanuel Herrmann, the son of the Bezirkshauptmann (district administrator) of Klagenfurt, entered the civil service in the Austrian ministry of commerce and qualified for a university career as a "Privatdozent" in the field of national economics. He was also a professor at the renowned Theresian Military Academy in Wiener Neustadt and from 1882 for twenty years professor of national economics at Vienna's Institute of Technology.

=== Birth of the postal card ===
On 26 January 1869 he published an article in Austria's leading paper Neue Freie Presse "Über eine neue Art des Korrespondenzmittels der Post", (i.e. "About a novel means of postal correspondence"), proposing that all envelope-size cards, whether written, produced by copying machine or printed, ought to be admitted as mail if they contained not more than 20 words including address and sender's signature and showed a 2-Kreuzer postage stamp. Regular letter postage was 5 Kreuzers.

Austria-Hungary's Postmaster General Vincenz Baron Maly von Vevanovič took up the idea, and in September 1869 the "Correspondence Card" was officially introduced in Austria by ministerial order. From 1 Oktober 1869 Austria's General Post Office was to issue postal cards for very brief messages, which, at a prize of two "Neukreuzers" (new Kreuzers), were to be delivered to any place within the dual monarchy, irrespective of the distance involved. The 20-word maximum was dropped. The front of the "correspondence card" showed the address, the rear was reserved for the message; apart from the two-headed eagle of Austria on the address side, or the Hungarian coat of arms in the Hungarian half of the dual monarchy, there were no pictures of any kind.

=== An international success with forerunners ===
Herrmann's novelty caused quite a stir abroad: Two British magazines wrote in the same year:

The Austrian government has introduced a novelty in postage, which might be introduced with great benefit in all countries. The object is to enable persons to send off; with the least possible trouble, messages of small importance, without the trouble of obtaining paper, pens, and envelopes. Cards of a fixed size are sold at all the post-offices for two kreutzers, one side being for the address and the other for this note, which may be written either with ink or with any kind of pencil. It is thrown into the box, and delivered without envelopes. A halfpenny post of this kind would certainly be very convenient, especially in large towns, and a man of business carrying a few such cards in his pocket-book would find them very useful. There is an additional advantage attaching to the card, namely, that of having the address and postmark inseparably fixed to the note.

Britain in fact very soon followed the Austrian example and introduced the postcard just a year later, and so did the North German Federation, together with the states of Württemberg and Baden; in 1871 Switzerland, Luxemburg, Belgium, the Netherlands, Denmark and Canada followed; 1871-74 Rumania, Russia, the Scandinavian countries, Spain, Japan, Itay, Chile and France followed whereas early as 1777 "L’Almanach de la Petite Poste" had reported about an early and short-lived forerunner(in translation):

"Nowadays, cards which are decorated with engravings are sent by post as compliments or best wishes upon the most diverse occasions, with messages that anyone can read. This new invention is by copperplate engraver Demaison and is much discussed."

And so did the US, where on 12 Mai 1873 the first official postcards appeared with a postage of 1 cent regardless of distance. However, as early as on 27 February 1861 US Congress had permitted the mailing of privately printed cards with a weight of one ounce or less, with a postage of one cent for delivery distances of up to 1500 miles, and of two cents for addresses further away, which was world-wide the very first official authorization of the use of postcards. This was taken advantage of by John P. Charlton of Philadelphia, who had his postcards copyrighted on 17 December 1861, yet none of his printed-message cards is known to have been used. Charlton allowed Hymen L. Lipman to print a second series of cards, which carried the name "Lipman's Postal Card". The earliest known postmark on these cards is of 25 October 1870; the patent that Lipman applied for was never granted.

At first, only domestic use of the "correspondence cards" was possible, but with the formation of the Universal Postal Union in 1874, international delivery became soon possible.

=== Development ===
Postcards with imprinted postage stamp (better named postal cards) were sold without any pictures, but soon private individuals began adding pictures of their own. From 1872 privately produced postcards were permitted in European countries, which the sender had to equip with postage stamps of differing values according to differing address regions. This offered the opportunity to print pictures on the card, at first some monochromes, from the late 1890s on in colour, and in huge quantities.

=== Controversy ===
The realization of his proposal through the Austro-Hungarian post office made Herrmann a well-known personality in Europe, but later his authorship of the postcard was contested. In the German Reichstag parliament, a government speaker declared that the Prussian post director Heinrich Stephan (later raised to "von Stephan") had voiced this idea already in 1865. At the 5th German postal conference in Karlsruhe in November 1865 Stephan had indeed distributed a private memorandum with a similar suggestion. "The present letter form does not provide the sufficient simplicity and shortness for a considerable number of messages". Stephan, however, had not actually proposed the postcard, but a postal sheet the size of a money transfer form, stiffer than letter paper and slightly larger than the usual envelope, with an imprinted duty stamp and available at all post offices. The prepaid postage was to be one silver groschen, which was the regular German postage fee. As this would have meant no reduction in postage, it would have been no actual innovation, but would only have simplified postal handling. In fact, Germany later introduced not Stephan's postal sheet due to its lack of privacy but a post card on precisely the Austrian model. It is, however, quite possible that Herrmann developed his model upon Stephan's suggestion. Heinrich von Stephan himself never claimed the authorship of the postcard idea.

== Folksong collector ==
Herrmann's quite different area of interest lay in the field of ethnology: He was an important collector of the folksongs of Carinthia, the Austrian state where he had come from.

The City of Vienna dedicated a grave of honour to Herrmann at the Meidling cemetery. The tombstone says: "Der Erfinder der Postkarte", that is: "The Inventor of the Postal Card." The official name was Correspondenz-Karte.

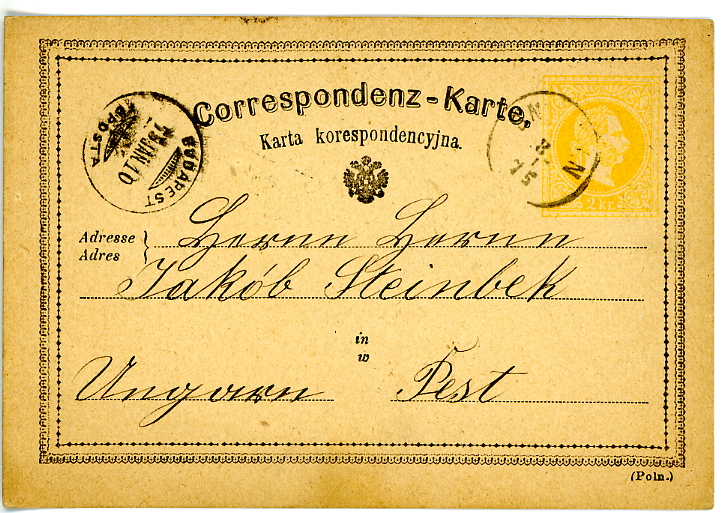
Postal card in 1875 - see official names

== Publications ==
- Die Theorie der Versicherung vom wirthschaftlichen Standpunkte, Graz 1868
- Leitfaden der Wirthschaftslehre, Graz 1870
- Miniaturbilder aus dem Gebiete der Wirthschaft, Halle a. S.( Nebert) 1872
- Naturgeschichte der Kleidung, Vienna (Waldheim) 1878
- Cultur und Natur. Studien auf dem Gebiete der Wirthschaft, Berlin 1887
- Technische Fragen und Probleme der modernen Volkswirtschaft, 1891
- Das Geheimnis der Macht. , 2nd edition, Berlin 1896

== Literature ==
- Franz Kalckhoff: Die Erfindung der Postkarte und die Korrespondenz-Karten der Norddeutschen Bundespost.(i.e. "The Invention of the Post Card and the Correspondence Card of the North German Federal Postal Service"), Leipzig 1911.
- Paul Noēl Armand and Paul Yvon Armand, Dictionnaire de la Cartophilie Francophone, Herblay 1990.
- Wolfgang Till, Alte Postkarten, Collector's Catalogue, Augsburg 1994.
