= Large-letter postcard =

North American picture postcard style

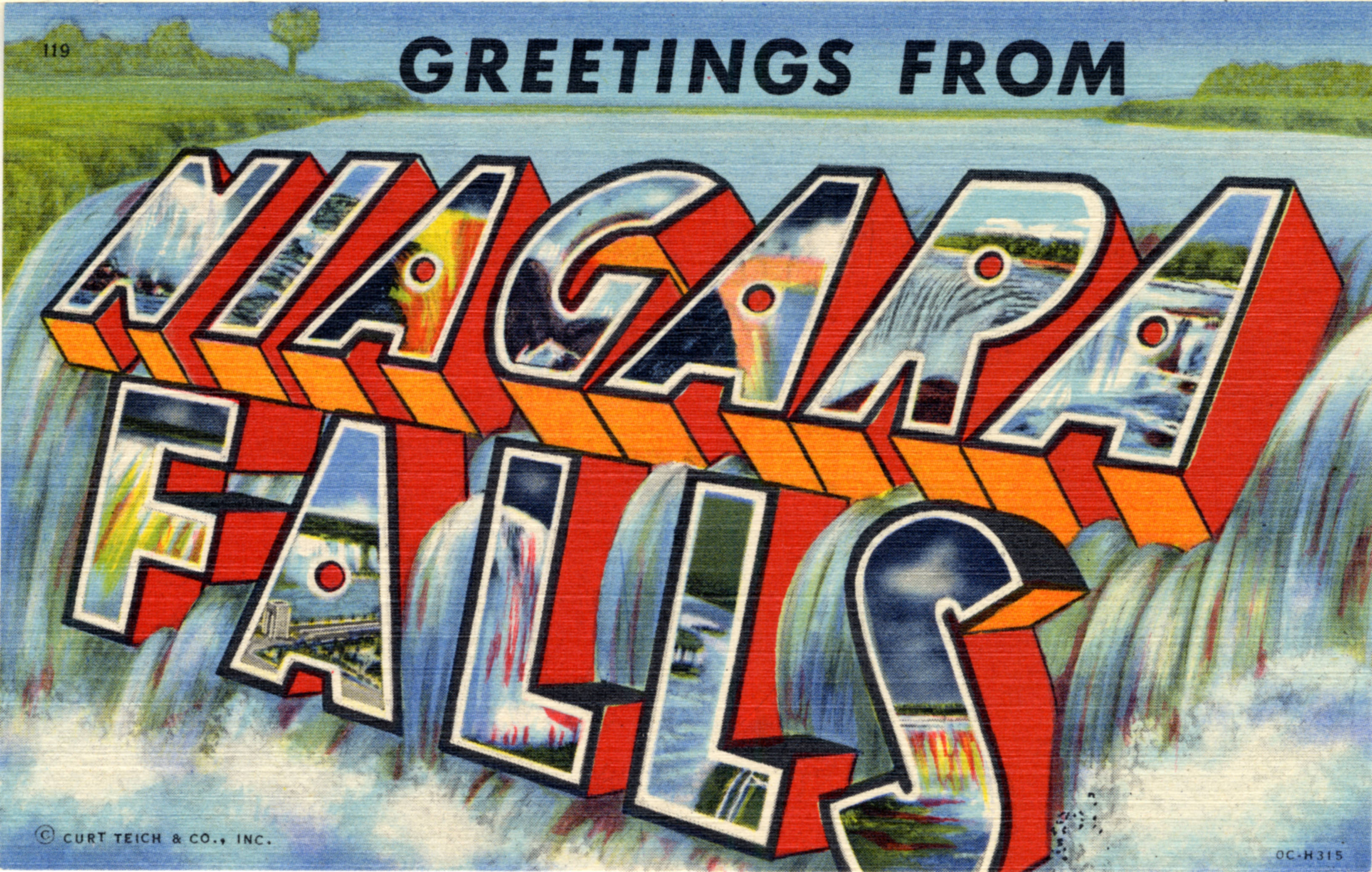
Large-letter postcard featuring Niagara Falls, published c. 1950 by Curt Teich & Co.

Large-letter postcards were a style of postcards popular in North America in the first half of the 20th century, especially the 1930s through the 1950s. The cards are so-called because the name of a tourist destination was printed in three-dimensional block letters, each of which were inset with images of local landmarks. Sometimes called big-letter postcards, many featured the stock phrase "Greetings from..." which was derived from cards in Germany that read Gruss Aus.

The original postcards were "printed on linen-textured paper with a high rag content, allowing absorption of dyes from high-speed German lithographic presses," thus large-letter postcards are usually a subtype of linen postcards, although the basic design existed earlier. The postcards produced by Curt Teich (rhymes with "like") and competitors were "distinctly American, rendered in an opulent style." The "gaudy dyes" created a vivid and distinct look that consumers loved, and the firm of Curt Teich flourished. The images were usually composed of hand-drawn letters and heavily retouched photographs that became almost painterly through the multiple design and production stages. Large-letter linen postcards usually had divided backs and a bit of information about the location for souvenir collectors. The basic design of a large-letter had existed since 1900 but it was only with the color and design innovations of the 1930s that they "exploded" in popularity. Early designs had unrealistic quality in part because the composing artist had never been to the place depicted, but by the 1940s "color transparencies were being used more extensively as the image source, and pictures started to become more realistic."

In his day, Curt Teich produced cards for all 50 U.S. states and more than 1,000 cities. Tichnor Company also produced large-letter designs. A 50-pane USPS stamp set was issued in 2002 with large-letter postcard imagery from each of the 50 U.S. states.

== See also ==
- History of postcards in the United States
- Greetings Tour
