= Tichnor Brothers =

Boston postcard company

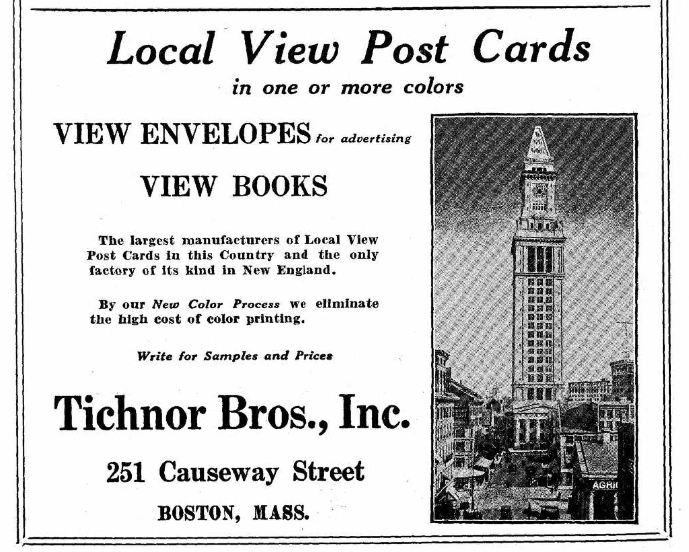
Tichnor Bros. advertisement in 1916 city directory

Tichnor Brothers, Inc. was a Boston-based American graphic arts and printing company in operation from 1908 to 1987. Tichnor was one of the major producers of souvenir postcards of American cities in the 20th century, including large-letter postcards from 1936 to 1952. Tichnor and Curt Teich were rivals; in at least one case Curt Teich managers wanted to copy a view from a Tichnor postcard. The Tichnor Bros. archives, a valuable source for American architectural and cultural history, are held at Boston Public Library, which has also posted thousands of free-use images online at their Digital Commonwealth site and in Flickr albums.

The founding brothers were Harry N. Tichnor (July 7, 1877 – July 26, 1911) and Louis Tichnor (September 11, 1879 – November 6, 1974). Harry and Louis were two of Morris and Dora (Weiss) Tichnor's eight children; the others were Annie, Rose, Caroline, Samuel, Rudolph and Fred. Morris and Dora were emigrants of Jewish ancestry from the Austro-Hungarian Empire. Louis was born Leopold Tichnor; Louis' obituary said the firm was established in 1897. Harry Tichnor died of a burst appendix in 1911. Louis died at age 95 after a long illness; he was survived by his brother Samuel (among others). The name is sometimes spelled Ticknor or Teichner in early records.

== Additional images ==
Tichnor Bros. postcard images from their home state of Massachusetts
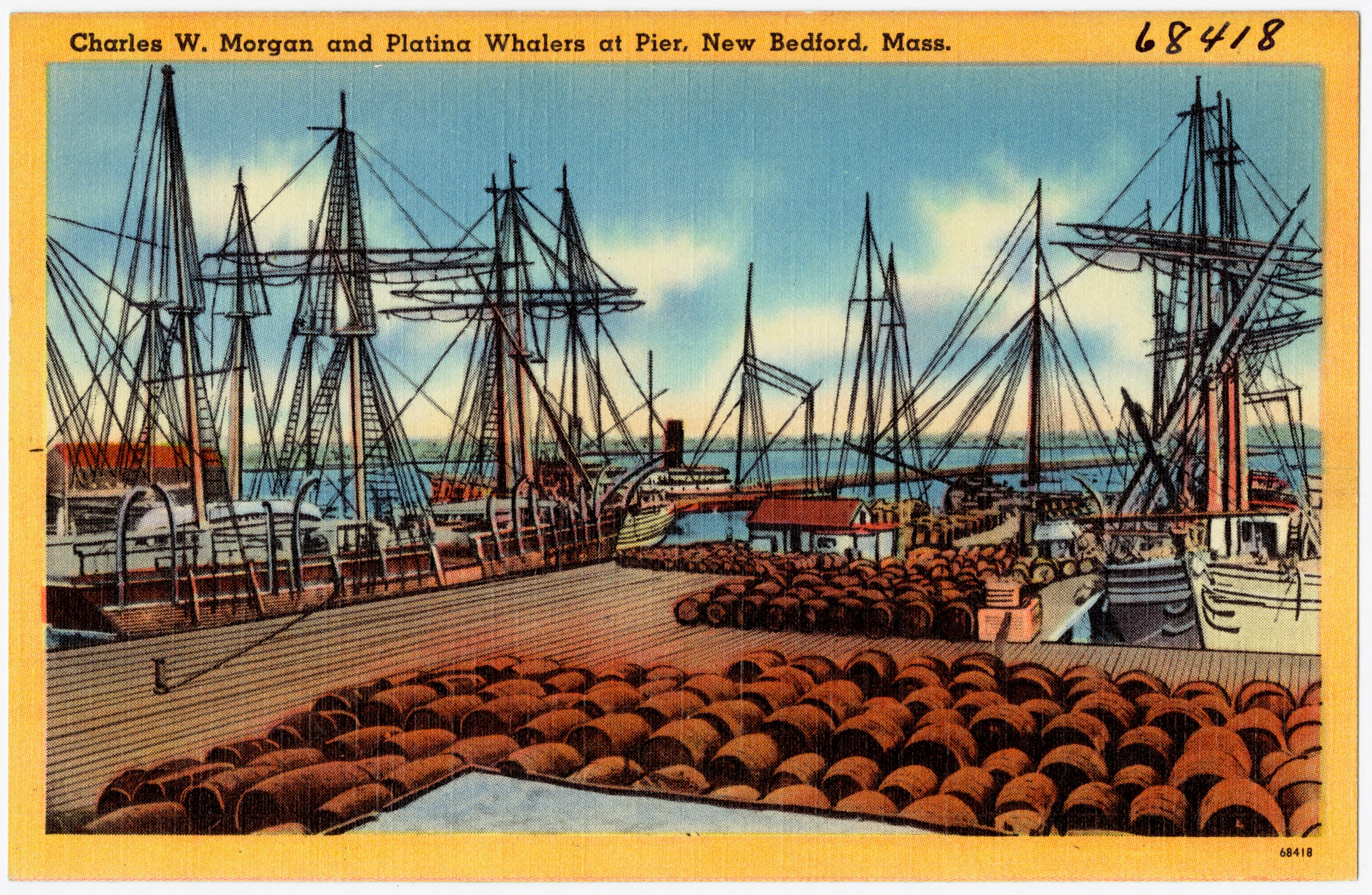
Charles W. Morgan and Platina Whalers at pier, New Bedford, Mass.

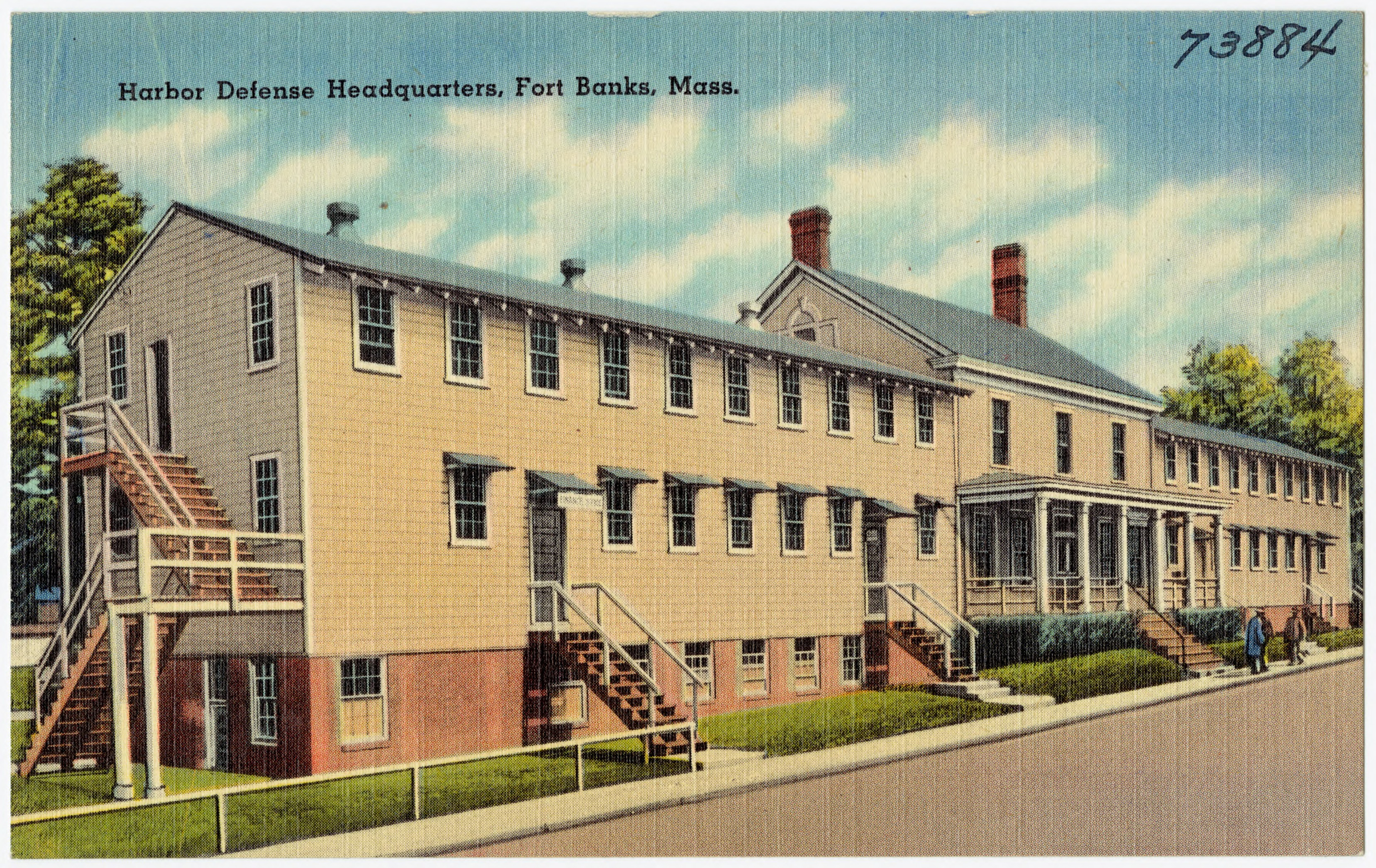
Harbor Defense Headquarters, Fort Banks, Mass.

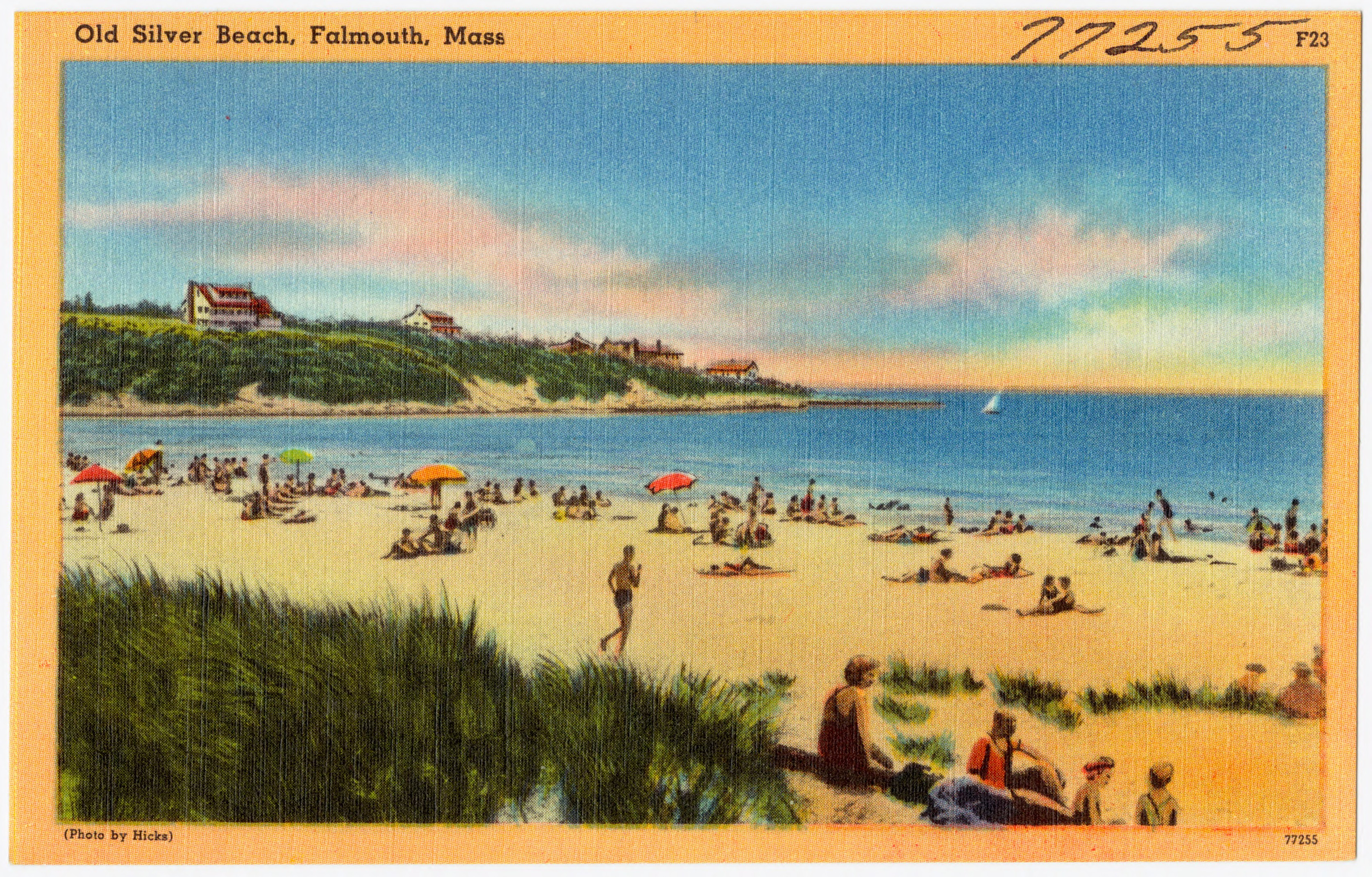
Old Silver Beach, Falmouth, Mass.

== See also ==
- Curt Teich
