= Greetings Tour =

Postcard mural project in Manhattan, US

- Years active: 2015–present
- Location: United States
- Major figures: Victor "Ving" Fung and Lisa Beggs
- Influences: Vintage greetings postcards

The Greetings Tour is a traveling mural project by mural artists Victor "Ving" Fung and photographer Lisa Beggs. The artist duo has been traveling the United States by RV since 2015 creating postcard-inspired murals as destination landmarks. "It's inspired by vintage postcards from the 1930s to 1950s that read 'Greetings From,' which informs their project, Greetings Tour."

Using the classic large letter postcard style, the Greetings Tour works with communities to create colorful murals featuring local landmarks, history and culture. They have created murals in cities across the United States including Honolulu, Altadena, Anchorage, San Diego, New Orleans, Moab, Chicago, Tucson, Bend, Manhattan, and Louisville. In 2019, they painted their first international mural as part of the series in Bermuda.

Lisa Beggs photographs the content from their travels and relevant images that go into the mural designs. Victor Ving paints the images using spray paint and latex. Their goal is to paint a mural in every state and then take the project to an international level. In April 2020, the artists announced a yearly grant to donate a mural back to community-oriented organizations and those impacted financially by the COVID-19 pandemic.
