= John P. Charlton =

19th-century American printer and inventor

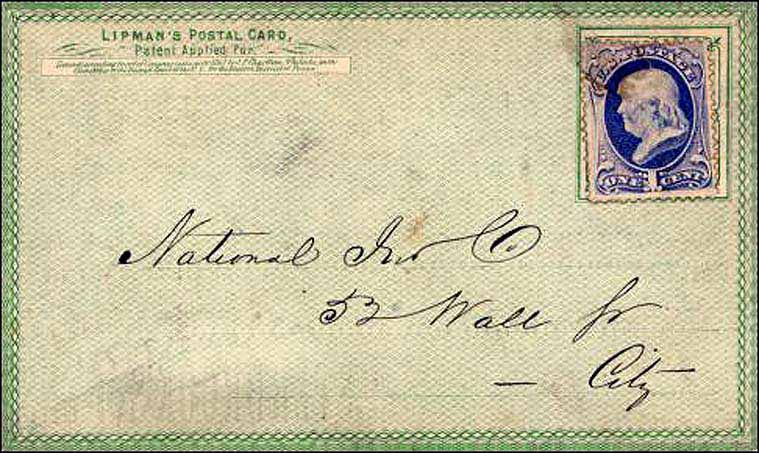
A postcard printed by Charlton and Lipman

John P. Charlton was an American printer and stationer from Philadelphia, Pennsylvania, who is often credited as the inventor of the private postal card, which he copyrighted in 1861 together with Hymen Lipman.

== History of Charlton's postal card ==
The first postal cards have been used by William Henry Jackson, an artist and photographer, who painted Civil War battlefields in the beginning of the 1860s and used them to write to his family. Charlton invented the private postal card around the same time in 1861 in Philadelphia. He copyrighted and patented the idea in the same year. He later transferred the rights to the idea to his friend and fellow printer Hymen Lipman who was also credited for the invention and who printed the postal cards with a decorative border and a small print reading "Lipman's Postal Card. Patent Applied For." (see picture). Lipman's cards were also the ones that were first known as "post cards".

== Design ==
Charlton's invention was a plain card (except the decorative border), the face of which was completely reserved for the message. The reverse side was for the destination address and the 1¢ stamp. Neither side bore a picture or similar decoration, as modern picture postcards do. The well-known postcard format of a divided back (for text and address) with an image on the whole front was not used in the US until 1907, although they were used earlier in other countries.

== End of production ==
Charlton and Lipman stopped production of their postal cards in 1873. The United States had previously allowed non-government issued post cards to be circulated as long as proper postage was affixed to it and they confined to the government's regulations. Starting in 1873 however, the government began to issue their own post cards measuring 130 x 75 mm. This lasted until May 19, 1898, when Congress passed the Private Mailing Card Act.

== See also ==
- History of postcards in the United States
