= Curt Teich =

American postcard manufacturer (1877–1974)

Curt Teich, Sr.
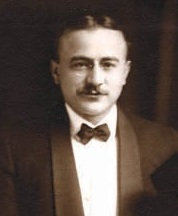
- Born: 1877; Greiz, Thuringia
- Died: 1974 (aged 96–97); Indian Rocks Beach, Florida
- Occupation: Publisher

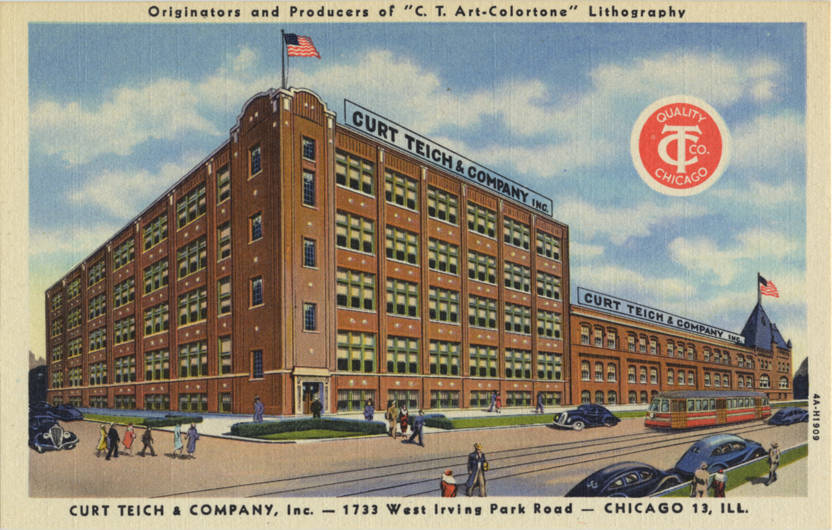
Curt Teich & Company, Inc. factory in Chicago

Curt Otto Teich (March 1877 – 1974) was an American publisher of German descent who produced popular color postcards, primarily of scenes from American life. He was a pioneer of the offset printing process. Under his management, Curt Teich & Company became the world's largest printer of view and advertising postcards.

== Life ==
Teich was born in Greiz, Thuringia (modern-day Germany), and, following his family's traditional career as printers and publishers, worked as a printer's apprentice in Lobenstein. He immigrated to the United States in 1895, where he initially worked as a printer's devil in New York, a much lower position than he had held in Germany.

Teich moved to Chicago, Illinois, and started his own firm—Curt Teich & Company—in January 1898.

Teich is best known for its "Greetings From" postcards with their big letters, vivid colors, and bold style. "Greetings From" postcards had originated in Germany in the 1890s, and Teich successfully imported the style to the American market after a visit in 1904. Teich employed hundreds of traveling salesmen, who sold picture postcards to domestic residences, and encouraged business to create advertising postcards; these salesmen also photographed the businesses and worked with the owners to create an idealized image.

The company closed in 1978. The Teich family donated archives of the company to the Lake County Discovery Museum in Illinois which started the Curt Teich Postcard Archive. In 2016, it was announced that the archives would be transferred to the Newberry Library. Altogether, the Newberry Library received approximately 2.5 million total items including nearly 500,000 postcard images. On April 3, 2017, the Curt Teich Postcard Archives Collection was opened to researchers.

== Gallery ==
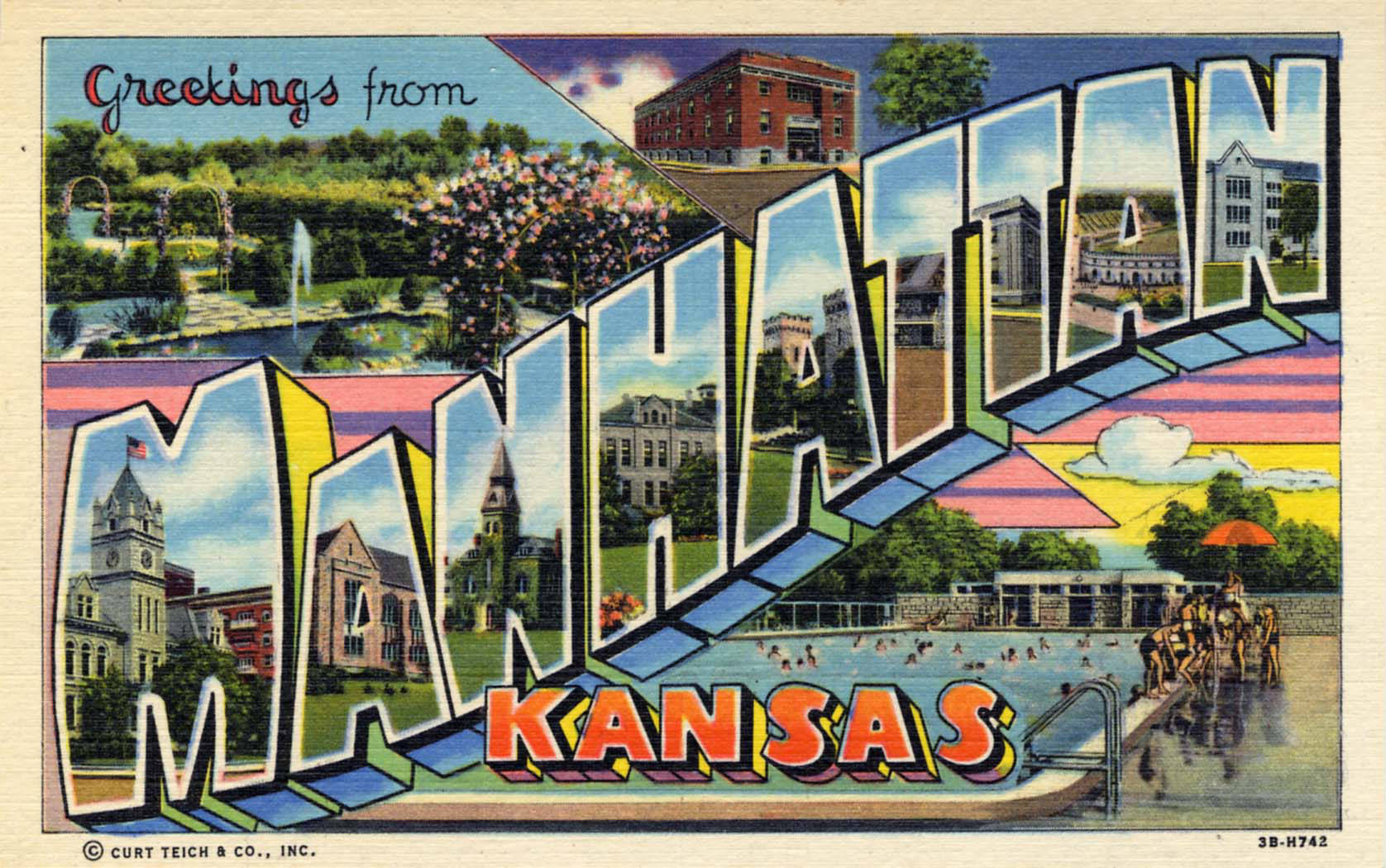
Curt Teich & Co's distinctive "Greetings From" large-letter postcard layout and art style.

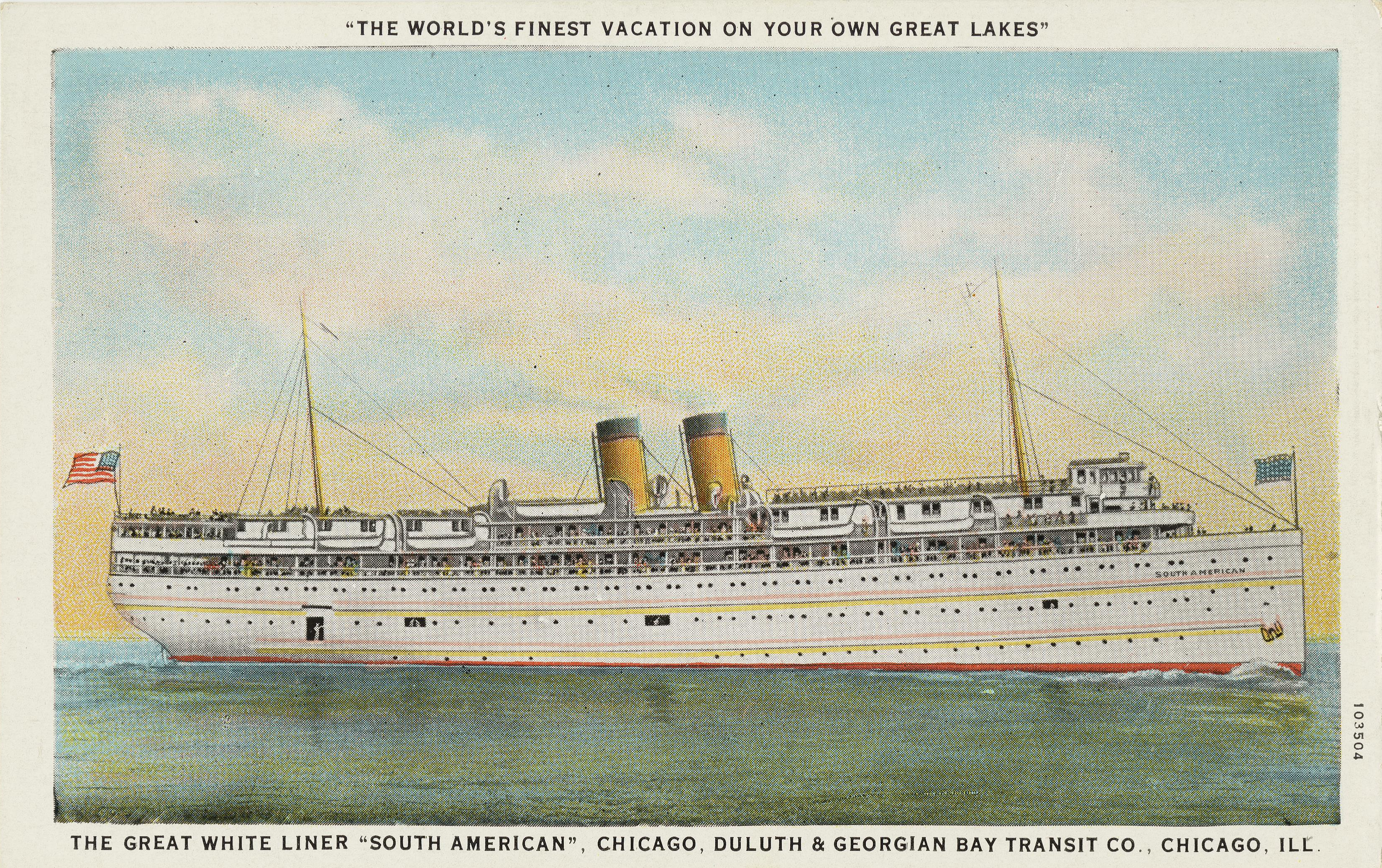
The Great White Liner "South American", Chicago, Illinois, circa 1915–1930 source Curt Teich & Co. postcard 103504

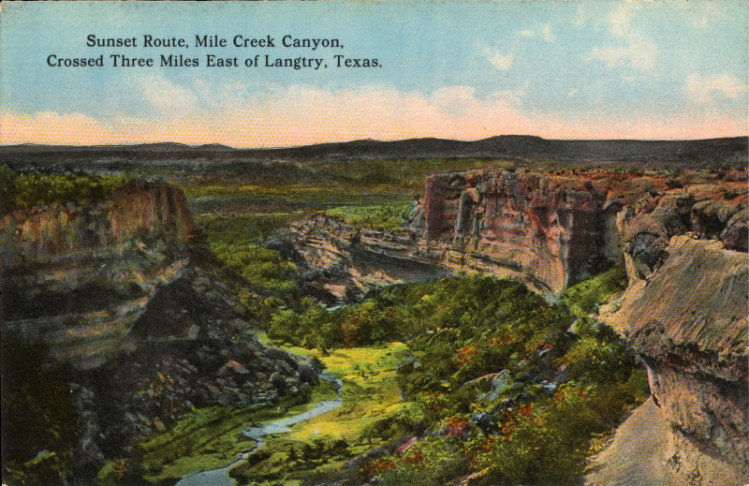
Sunset Route, Mile Canyon, Texas, circa 1908 source Curt Teich & Co. postcard

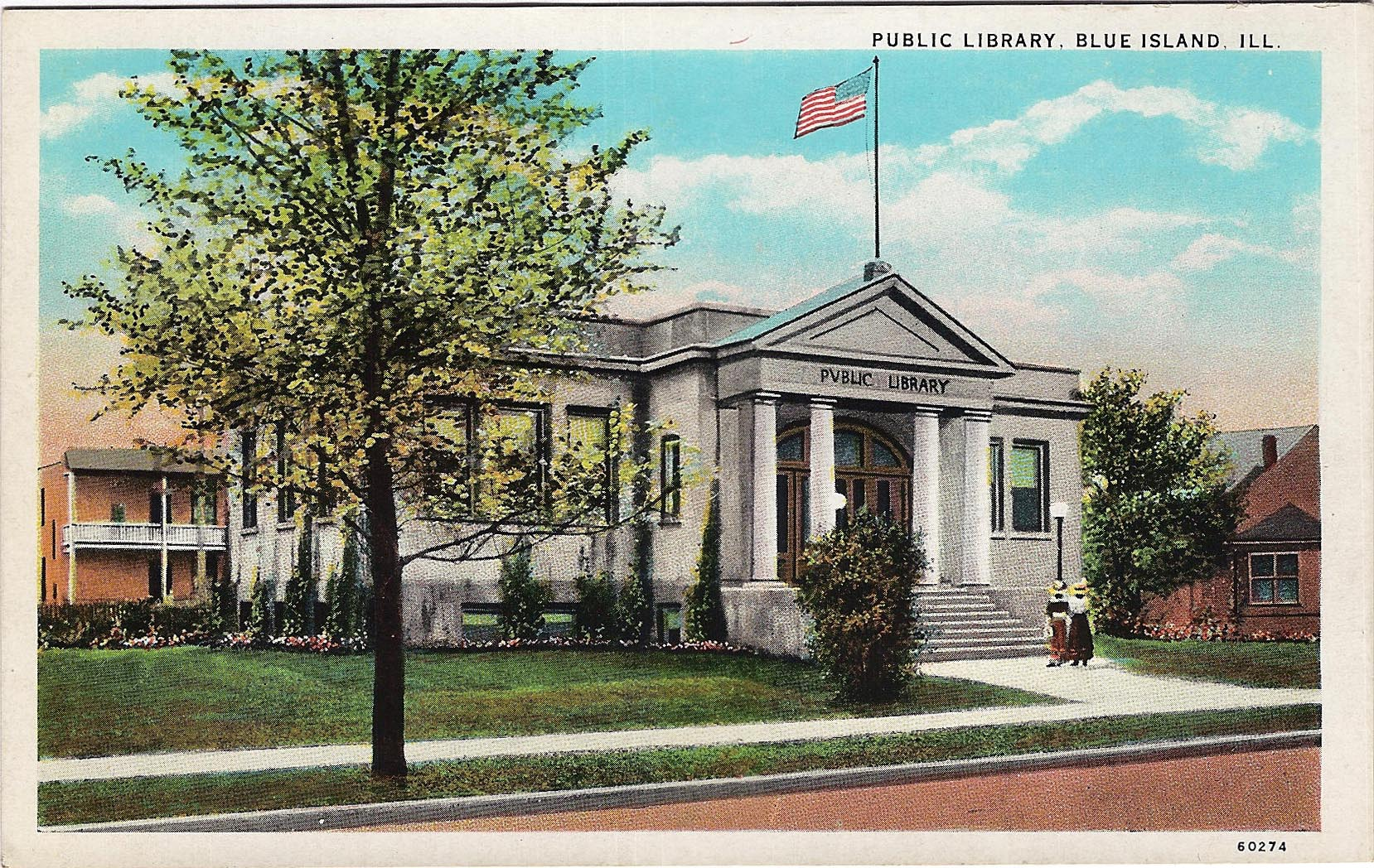
The Carnegie Library in Blue Island, IL - William A. Otis, architect (1903, demolished 1969) source Curt Teich & Co. postcard 60274

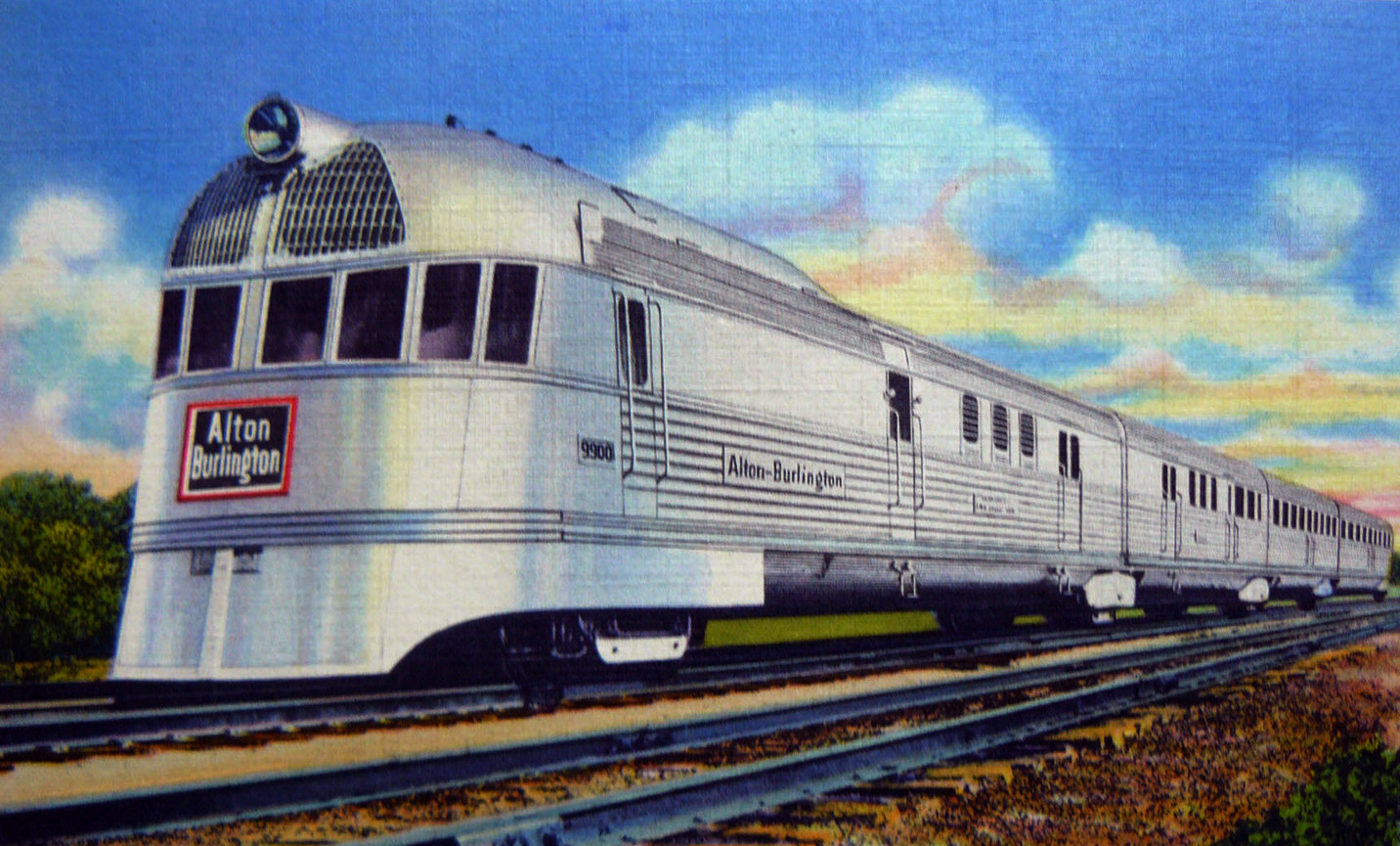
"The Ozark State Zephyr", Alton-Burlington first streamlined diesel powered train, circa 1937 source Curt Teich & Co. postcard 7A-H49

== See also ==
- Tichnor Brothers
