= Hymen Lipman =

American inventor

Hymen L. Lipman
- Born: March 20, 1817; Kingston, Jamaica
- Died: November 4, 1893 (aged 76); Philadelphia, Pennsylvania, US
- Occupation: Stationer
- Known for: Patent of the first pencil with attached eraser

Hymen L. Lipman (March 20, 1817 – November 4, 1893) was an American stationer and inventor credited with registering the first patent for a pencil with an attached eraser on March 30, 1858.

== Early life ==
Hymen L. Lipman was born in Kingston, Jamaica, on March 20, 1817, to Lewis Lipman, an English merchant. Lyman immigrated to the US around 1829, arriving and settling in Philadelphia, Pennsylvania. He resided in Philadelphia for the remainder of his life.

== Career ==
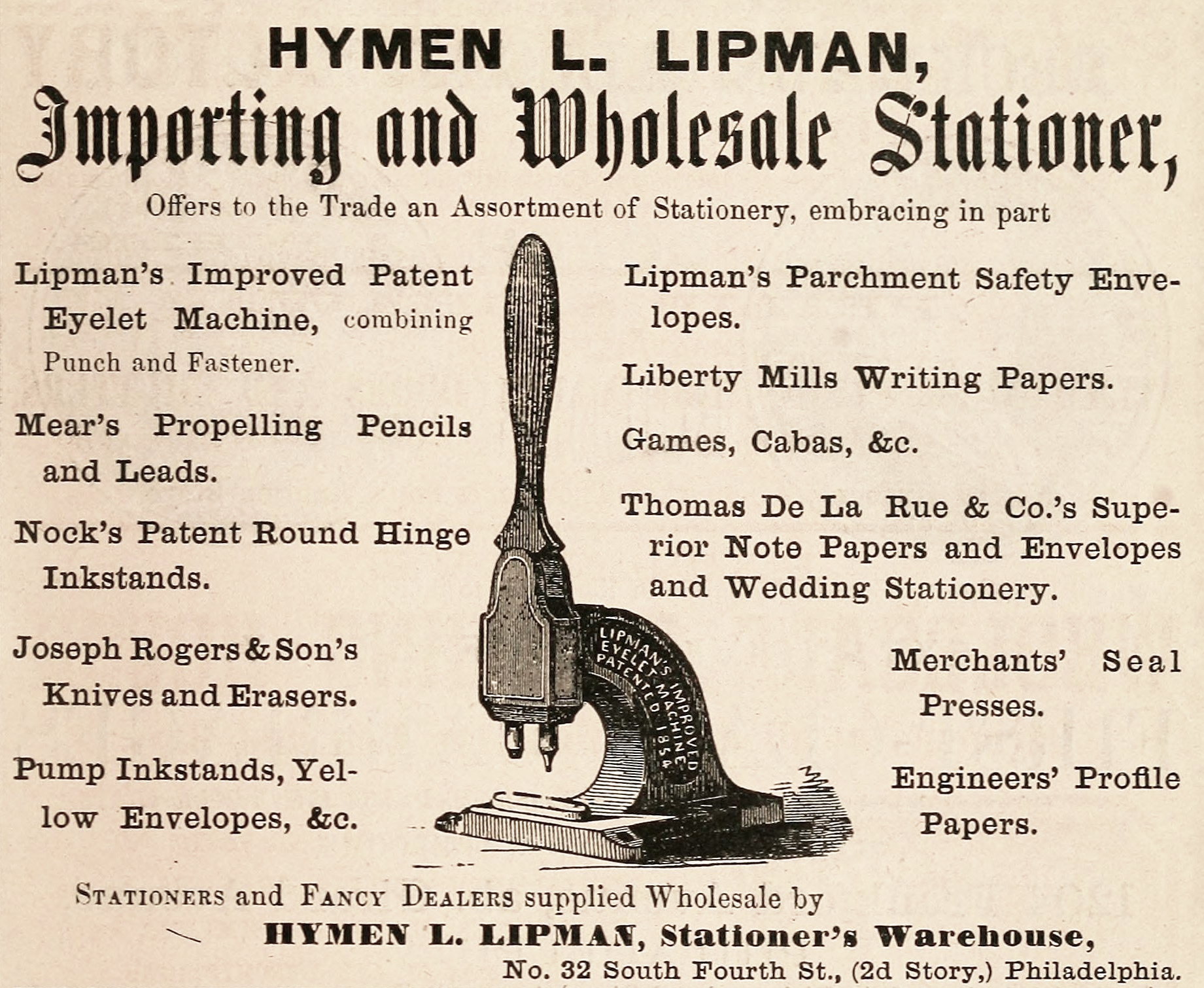
1860 advertisement for Lipman's stationery business

In 1840, Lipman succeeded Samuel M. Stewart, then the leading stationer in Philadelphia. Three years later, he started the first envelope company in the US.

In 1862, Lipman sold his lead-pencil and eraser patent for $100,000 to Joseph Reckendorfer, who went to sue the pencil manufacturer Faber for infringement. In 1875, the US Supreme Court ruled against Reckendorfer, declaring the patent invalid because his invention was actually a combination of two already known things with no new use.

== Personal life ==
In 1848, he married Mary A. Lehman, daughter of Peter K. Lehman, one of the founders of the Philadelphia College of Pharmacy. Their children where Mary, Lewis, and Anna Elizabeth "Lillie" Lipman.

Lipman died at his Philadelphia home November 4, 1893, aged 76, and his wife a year later. Both were buried in Laurel Hill Cemetery. Some sources have described him or his family as Jewish, yet Haaretz notes a contemporary obituary describes him as a "self-sacrificing Christian" and his and his wife's gravestone epitaphs contain Christian quotes. His contemporary obituary in the Philadelphia Inquirer states he was a secretary of the Philadelphia Sabbath Association, an elder at Philadelphia's Clinton Street Presbyterian Church and later a member of the Grace Protestant Episcopal Church.
